= Rhône Group =

American private equity firm

Rhône Group L.L.C.
- Type: Private
- Industry: Private equity
- Founded: 1995; 31 years ago
- Founders: Robert Agostinelli; Steven Langman
- Headquarters: International Building, New York City, US
- Products: Private equity
- AUM: $10 billion (2025)
- Number of employees: 33 (2025)
- Website: rhonegroup.com

Rhône Group L.L.C. is an American private equity firm with approximately $11 billion of assets under management, specializing in mergers and acquisitions, leveraged buyouts, recapitalizations, and partnerships with particular focus on European and trans-Atlantic investments. Rhône also offers financial advisory services, strategic alliances, joint partnerships, and business valuation services. Rhone Group was listed in 2013 to 2014 by Preqin as the 'Most Consistent Performing Private Equity Fund Manager' based on both its multiple and IRR of all 3 funds in the top quartile ranking.

Rhône is headquartered at the International Building at Rockefeller Center in New York City, with additional offices in London and Paris. Rhône was founded in 1995 by billionaire investors Robert Agostinelli and Steven Langman. The pair have been managing Rhône since inception. The company tends to invest in energy, materials, industrials, retailing, consumer staples, healthcare, and financial sectors. The company is a U.S. Securities and Exchange Commission registered investment advisor. Investors include government and private sector pension and retirement funds, charitable foundations, university endowments, insurance companies, family savings and sovereign wealth funds. It focuses primarily on investments in European and trans-Atlantic companies.

== London Office ==
In 2011, Rhône Group moved from their Knightsbridge office to 40 Bruton Street, Mayfair, signing a ten-year lease for the top three floors covering 8,000 square feet, at £105 per sq ft, the then-highest rent achieved in the West End.

== Funds ==
- Rhône Capital Partners Fund I
- Rhône Capital Partners Fund II
- Rhône Capital Partners Fund III
- Rhône Capital Partners Fund IV
- Rhône Capital Partners Fund V

== Investments ==
=== Freddy's ===
In August 2025, Rhône agreed to acquire Freddy's Frozen Custard & Steakburgers from Thompson Street Capital Partners for an enterprise value of around $700 million.

=== Maxam ===
In August 2018, Rhône acquired a 45% stake in MAXAM Corp from Advent International. Maxam is among the three largest explosives companies in the world. The history of MAXAM Corp dates back to 1872 when Alfred Nobel founded the Sociedad Española de la Pólvora Dinamita in Bilbao, Spain. The company offers high-tech products and services ranging from terra solutions, outdoors, defense, and chemicals. Blasting solutions, cartridges and gunpowder, and raw materials for the nitro chemical industry are some of its key products. One of their brand's EXPAL specializes in demilitarization by recycling explosives recovered from different sectors such as infrastructures, mining industry, and demolitions. MAXAM generated revenue of over €1.1bn for its fiscal year to 31 March 2018. Rhône invested from its fifth fund which sees Maxam's management group retaining the remaining 55% of the company's shares. MAXAM has in excess of 6,500 employees, more than 50 subsidiaries, 80 industrial units and commercial operations in over 100 countries. The transaction sees Morgan Stanley act as financial advisor to Advent, and Lazard Frères as financial advisor to Rhône. Legal advisor to Advent was Uría Menéndez, while Pérez-Llorca and Kirkland & Ellis advised Rhône.

=== Fogo de Chão ===
In February 2018, Rhône acquired Brazilian steakhouse chain Fogo de Chão for $560 million. Founded in 1979 in Porto Alegre, Rio Grande do Sul, Brazil, it now operates in nearly 50 locations in the U.S., Mexico, Saudi Arabia, UAE and Brazil with plans for over 100 locations worldwide. The price of $15.75 a share was paid in cash, which represents a 25% premium over the restaurant company's closing price on the Nasdaq. In 2023, Rhône sold the chain to Bain Capital for $1.1 billion.

=== Nestlé Confectionary USA ===
In January 2018, Rhône Capital entered a binding offer to acquire Nestlé’s US confectionary business, joining a $2.5 billion race that includes Italy's Ferrero SpA and The Hershey Company. The sale includes established brands such as Butterfinger, Nerds, Laffy Taffy, and Crunch chocolate bars. Nestlé was advised by Goldman Sachs on the sale process.

=== Hudson's Bay Company ===
In October 2017, Canada's oldest retailer Hudson's Bay Company agreed to sell its historic Lord & Taylor Building to Rhône Capital and WeWork in a transaction valued at $850 million. The flagship building has been a presence on Fifth Avenue for more than a century, the 10-story limestone structure opened in 1914, and was named a New York City designated landmark in 2007.

=== Santillana ===
In September 2017, Spanish media company Prisa confirmed it was in talks over the sale of its Santillana publishing group with Rhône Capital. El Confidencial reported that Rhone was in negotiations to submit an offer of around $1.7 billion for the 75 percent stake Prisa holds in Santillana.

=== VistaJet ===
In 2017, Rhône invested $150 million cash into VistaJet together with secondary acquisitions, Rhône will have a $200 million stake in VistaJet. This ground breaking investment transaction serves as another key milestone in VistaJet's growth story and a major vote of confidence in the company's strategy and business model, valuing VistaJet's equity on a post-money basis in excess of $2.5 billion. VistaJet was founded by Thomas Flohr in 2004 and is now the second largest private aviation company in the world after NetJets. In 2019, VistaJet acquired JetSmarter, regarded as the Uber of private aviation, also acquiring XOJET the year prior in order to consolidate its purchase of competitors and lead consolidation in the private jet industry.

=== WeWork ===
In 2016, Rhône Group partnered with WeWork to raise several hundred million dollars for a real estate investment fund. The partners have already approached New York City landlords about buying properties where the coworking company is a tenant. Fundraising for the vehicle, dubbed WeWork Property Investors, is still ongoing. Buying into its properties would allow the co-working company to benefit from property appreciation it says it creates as a tenant. On March 9, the company filed offering documents for four private equity funds. WeWork Property Investors and WeWork Property Investors Funds A, B and B1 with the U.S. Securities and Exchange Commission. The filings list several WeWork and Rhone Group executives as fund directors. In March 2017, Rhône together with WeWork launched a $400 million real estate investment fund. In November, that fund paid $850 million for WeWork's new global headquarters at Lord & Taylor’s flagship on Fifth Avenue in Manhattan.

=== Zodiac Pool Solutions ===
In October 2016, Rhône Group entered into an agreement to acquire Zodiac Pool Solutions from the Carlyle Group including its global pool business and family of premium brands. Financial terms of the agreement were not disclosed. Carlyle was advised on the transaction by Credit Suisse and Allen & Overy LLP. Rhône was advised on the transaction by Morgan Stanley and Sullivan & Cromwell LLP.

=== Garda World Corporation ===
In February 2016, Rhône Capital agreed to acquire 45% of the outstanding shares of the parent company of Garda World Security Corp., from Apax Partners and certain management stockholders of the business. Garda World Security Corp. a security and cash services provider, was founded in 1995 by Stéphan Crétier and is now the world's largest privately owned security company employing over 85,000 people worldwide. In May 2017 Rhone increased its equity holding to 61% completing the purchase of all of Apax's remaining participation in GardaWorld.

=== Scandinavian Tobacco Group ===
In November 2014, Scandinavian Tobacco Group, the world's largest manufacturer of cigars and pipe tobacco began talks with firm Rhône Capital about a potential sale of the company for around $2 billion. CVC Capital and Pamplona Capital were also listed as potential bidders. STG is owned by Skandinavisk Holding and Swedish Match and have hired JPMorgan Chase to look at options for the business and explored an initial public offering before deciding on a sale. STG has 10,000 employees in 20 countries and EBITDA of SEK1.2 billion ($201 million) on revenue of SEK5.9 billion for 2013.

=== GK Holdings, Inc. ===
In 2014, Rhône Group acquired Global Knowledge from MidOcean Partners. In October 2021 it was announced that Global Knowledge will be bought by Churchill Capital Corp II and will be merged with Skillsoft.

=== Elizabeth Arden, Inc. ===
In 2014, Rhône Group entered into an agreement with Elizabeth Arden, Inc. (RDEN.O) for a tender offer to acquire up to 30% of the company. In June 2016, Elizabeth Arden was acquired by Revlon.

=== Ranpak Corp. ===
In October 2014, Rhône Group acquired Ranpak, for around $1 billion from Odyssey Investment Partners LLC. Harris Williams & Co. advised Ranpak Corp. on the sale. Ranpak is headquartered in Ohio, US and was established in 1972, it manufactures paper-based packaging for more than 25,000 companies in the electronics, food and beverage, and pharmaceutical industries worldwide. In June 2018, Rhône began discussion with Goldman Sachs regarding the sale of Ranpak Inc., which could fetch up to $1.5 billion and has about $100 million in annual earnings before interest, taxes, depreciation and amortization. In December 2018, a special purpose acquisition company formed by One Madison Group's Omar Asali and Jonathan Soros's JC Capital, agreed to purchase Ranpak for $950 million.

=== Neovia Logistics ===
In September 2014, Rhône Group together with Goldman Sachs acquired logistics services provider Neovia Logistics for more than $1 billion. Goldman Sachs' and Rhone Capital's consortium prevailed over a rival bid from Blackstone Group. The sale of Neovia comes just two years after private equity firm Platinum Equity acquired a 65% stake in the company from Caterpillar Inc., leaving the industrial conglomerate with a 35% interest.

=== TWE Global ===
In August 2014, Rhône Capital together with joint partner Kohlberg Kravis Roberts began talks for a takeover bid of the world's second largest wine producer, Treasury Wine Estates for a total deal value of $3.4 billion. TWE Global has revenue of over $2 billion and employs more than 4,000 people worldwide, encompassing 80 label brands including Penfolds, Wolf Blass, Beringer, Lindemans, Wynns and Rosemount. Rhone Group's partnership with KKR allowed for an 11% increase in offering from A$4.70 per share offered initially by KKR in April 2014 to A$5.20 cash per share in August 2014.

=== Coty, Inc. ===
In June 2013, Rhône along with Berkshire Partners and the Reimann family launched Coty, Inc. (COTY) into an IPO on the New York Stock Exchange raising over $1 billion valuing the company at around $6.7 billion. In 2012, Coty bid $10.7 billion for Avon Products Inc, (AVP.N) however due to a delayed response the offer was withdrawn. Coty's top 3 competitors are Estee Lauder Cos Inc. (EL.N), L'Oreal SA (OREP.PA) and Elizabeth Arden Inc (RDEN.O). Coty's brands in fragrances, color cosmetics including nail, skin and body care products support net revenues of $4.6 billion for the fiscal year ending June 30, 2012. Coty's top 10 brands are; Adidas, Calvin Klien, Chloe, Davidoff, Marc Jacobs, OPI, Philosophy, Playboy, Rimmel and Sally Hansen. Coty includes beauty brands ranging from ultra-premium luxury to entertainment, which include Balenciaga, Beyonce, Bottega Veneta, Chopard, Guess, Jennifer Lopez, JOOP!, Karl Lagerfeld, Kate Moss, Lady Gaga, Madonna, Roberto Cavalli, Vera Wang, Vivienne Westwood and others. Coty repurchased all shares from Rhone Capital and Berkshire partners in June 2014.

=== Eden Springs ===
In June 2013, Rhône acquired Mayanot Eden best known for its Eden Springs office water-cooler brand for $93.5 million. Eden is one of Europe's largest suppliers of watercoolers and the UK's market leader. In June 2016, Eden was acquired by Cott for $525 million.

=== ASK Chemicals ===
In April 2014, Rhône Group acquired the German ASK Chemicals (JV of Ashland Inc. and Swiss based Clariant). The deal was valued at about $350 million. ASK Chemicals is a leading foundry chemicals manufacturer with nearly 2,000 employees in 25 countries. It encompasses a range of foundry resources such as binders, coatings, feeders, filters and release agents, as well as metallurgical products including inoculants, inoculation wires and master alloys for iron casting. In 2013, ASK Chemicals generated annual revenues of €513 million.

=== CSM Global ===
In March 2013, Rhône Capital purchased CSM Bakery Product for $1.4 billion. The business is made up of the European Bakery Supplies and North American Bakery Products businesses, as well as the international Bakery Supplies activities. Rhône Capital will also acquire the CSM brand name. In 2012 these businesses had aggregate sales of $3.3 Billion and aggregate EBITA of $140 million. Total staff comprised 8,220 employees at the end of 2012. CSM shares rose nearly 8% following the announcement. Morgan Stanley and Price Waterhouse Coopers were joint advisers to Rhone. Rothschild and Rabobank acted for CSM.

=== Utex Industries ===
In March 2013, Rhône Capital sold one of its companies, Utex Industries, to Riverstone Holdings for approximately $800 million. KKR, First Reserve, and Ares Management were some of the companies considering bids. Rhone had previously acquired UTEX Industries in 2010 from the Audax Group, where they were advised by Lazard.

=== Orion Engineered Carbons ===
In April 2011, Rhône Capital purchased the Carbon Black unit from Evonik Industries AG for in-excess of $1.3 billion. At the time, Evonik described Carbon Black as the third largest in the world, including 16 production facilities in 11 countries with over 1,650 employees including 500 in Germany. Evonik was advised by Barclays Capital and Rhône was advised by Morgan Stanley. In July 2014, Rhone Capital filled for an IPO valuing the company at $1.36 billion.

=== Euromar LLC ===
In 2010, Rhone Capital made their first direct investment in the shipping industry. Euromar LLC, formed on March 25, 2010, is a joint venture of the Greek ship owner and operator Euroseas with Rhone Capital and Eton Park Capital Management, two recognized private investment firms. The partnership formed Euromar LLC, a Marshall Islands limited liability company. Pursuant to the terms of the joint venture, Rhone and Eton Park would each invest up to $75 million, equating to having a 42.86% interest each in the joint venture, whereas Euroseas would invest up to $25 million for a 14.28% interest in the joint venture, equating to a total investment of $175 million. Euroseas operates small and medium-sized container ships as well as dry bulk ships.

=== Liverpool F.C. ===
In March 2010, English Premier League football club Liverpool F.C. revealed that Rhône were in exclusive negotiations to potentially buy the football club. Rhône made a bid of £118.5 million for a controlling 40 percent stake in the Anfield club with an additional £25 million infusion of funds for transfers. Liverpool F.C's managing director Christian Purslow and manager Rafael Benitez both gave Tom Hicks and George N. Gillett, Jr. their recommendations to go ahead with the deal however Hicks and Gillett failed to meet the April 6th 2010 deadline set by Rhône. As a result, Liverpool F.C's £237 million debt to the Royal Bank of Scotland is still outstanding and lack of fresh investment has meant plans for work to begin on a new £350 million stadium have stalled.

In August 2010, Rhône re-emerged as a rival bidder in the takeover of Liverpool. Among other involved parties were Chinese businessman Kenny Huang, Yahya Kirdi's Syrian consortium, the Kuwaiti Al Kharafi family and Subrata Roy's Indian Sahara conglomerate. Liverpool's chairman, Martin Broughton, appointed by Barclays Capital, had hoped to identify a preferred bidder before the end of the transfer window, September 1, 2010. As a result of not having achieved this investment, George N. Gillett, Jr. and Tom Hicks were obliged to pay a £20 million penalty to the Royal Bank of Scotland.

=== Quiksilver Inc. ===
In 2009, Rhône loaned Quiksilver $150 million over five years to help the company refinance a U.S. line of credit and consolidate its European debt. The deal included $25.6 million in warrants which allowed Rhône to buy 30% of Quiksilver's shares making Rhône own over half the company. Rhône also assigned two new directors for Quiksilver's board. The deal was described by the Orange County Business Journal as a potential "lifesaver" for Quiksilver, which was initially struggling under the weight of their $560 million acquisition of French ski maker Rossignol. As a result, Quiksilver announced it no longer planned to sell its DC Shoes unit or any other brands it owned. Surfer Kelly Slater also signed a five-year extension of his endorsement deal with Quiksilver, and accepted a significant portion of his compensation in the form of the company's stock. In August 2010, Quiksilver completed an exchange of 31.1 million shares worth about $140 million for the debt, held by Rhone. At the time, Moody's stated that it could raise the debt rating on Quiksilver if the deal went through. Rhone has since exited their position making a return in excess of 22% on their investment.

=== Almatis ===
In 2007, Rhône sold Almatis, a producer of specialty alumina, to Dubai International Capital (DIC), the international investment arm of Dubai Holding, for $1.2 billion. DIC retained the existing management team and further supported the global growth strategy pursued by Almatis.

=== LWB Refractories ===
In 2007, Rhône bought LWB Refractories, described by the magazine Industrial Minerals as "the worlds leading refractory dolomite producer", from Lhoist Group S.A. for an undisclosed amount. In 2008, Rhône then sold LWB Refractories for $938 million. to Brazilian manufacturer Magnesita Refratarios S.A. The deal created what is now one of the world largest refractory manufacturers. Clifford Chance advised Rhône in connection with the combination of RHI AG and Magnesita to create a leading refractory company named RHI Magnesita, established in the Netherlands and listed on the London Stock Exchange, Rhone would remain the controlling shareholder.

=== InfOTE ===
In 2007, Rhône won the auction for the Greek Yellow Pages directories business InfOTE. Rhône acquired the business in partnership with buyout group Zarkona Trading for $450 million giving Rhône an 85% holding of the company and Zarkona with 15%. Rhône outbid rival US media-focused buyout group Veronis Suhler Stevenson, UK-based private equity house Bridgepoint, and DLJ Merchant Banking, the buyout arm of Credit Suisse, as well as Greek media group Antenna.

=== Fraikin ===
In 2007, Rhône together with Eurazeo sold truck rental company Fraikin to CVC Capital Partners for €1.35 billion. Eurazeo owned 55%, and Rhône owned 20%. The remaining percentage is owned by other minority shareholders and management.

=== Arizona Chemical ===
In 2006, Rhône bought Arizona Chemical for $485 million. The deal officially closed in the first quarter of 2007. Arizona Chemical is the world's largest producer of oleochemicals and specialty resins based on crude tall oil, a by-product of wood pulping. Arizona Chemical manufactures pine tree-based chemicals, such as fatty acids, rosin esters, and terpenes. These chemicals are used to manufacture products including adhesives, household cleaners, hydraulic fluids, inks, paints, personal care products, and plastics. Arizona Chemical was formed in 1930 by paper products maker International Paper and American Cyanamid and is now owned by Rhône. Arizona Chemical filed for an IPO in 2010. Arizona Chemical has been a leader in pine chemistry for more than 75 years.

=== UniEuro ===
In 2001, the UK's largest electronics retailer, Dixons bought Italy's most profitable chain of domestic appliance stores, UniEuro, from Rhône and JP Morgan for €368 million to take controlling interest of nearly 96% of the company with an option to buy the remaining 4% for €30 million. UniEuro employs over 3,000 people and as of 2006 had a turnover of €1 billion.

=== Lummus Technology ===
In June 2020 in partnership with Haldia Petrochemical Rhone Capital bought Lummus Technology from McDermott Inc. McDermott was in bankruptcy and in need of capital to pay off debt but retained an option for a minority stake. After their plan of reorganization was accepted McDermott exercised the option in March 2021.

=== Other investments ===
- Coty, Inc.
- Dufour Yachts ISB
- Early Learning Centre
- Go-Ahead Group
- Rexair LLC
- WTVX
- Wahoo Fitness

== Disclosure ==
Rhône is authorised and regulated by the Financial Conduct Authority (FCA) and the U.S Securities Exchange Commission (SEC). Rhône is a 'Selected Client' and 'Sponsor' to Sullivan & Cromwell LLP.
