= Juanjo López =

Spanish professor and researcher

- Born: Juan José López García; 1980 (age 45–46); Lleida
- Education: Phd. Law and Society Universidad a Distancia de Madrid (UDIMA, 2018)
- Occupations: Researcher and digital entrepreneur
- Employer: CEO Grupo Royal Comunicación

Juan José López García, known as Juanjo López (Lleida, 1980) is a Spanish researcher and entrepreneur in the digital sector. As a researcher and academic, he is a specialist in digital marketing (e-commerce).

== Academic and teaching development ==
Juan José López holds a PhD in Law and Society from the Universidad a Distancia de Madrid (UDIMA) and has several postgraduate degrees, including the PDG from IESE Business School. His doctoral thesis, "Análisis de las acciones de marketing digital en el ámbito B2C a partir de un estudio empírico" (Analysis of digital marketing actions in the B2C environment based on an empirical study), was read in 2018. His research activity is focused on the study of user behavior on the internet and the optimization of digital campaigns.

Through teaching, he has contributed to the professionalization of brand ambassadors and other digital actors. Since 2015 he has been an associate professor at UDIMA on web analytics and since 2013 at ESIC on digital marketing. He has been a professor, director and tutor at the EOI Business School, of a variety of subjects in the digital world and business (2009–19), and has taught at the University of Navarra, Autonomous University of Barcelona, and at the universities of Coruña, Granada, Baleares, Elche, Pablo de Olavide, and Camilo José Cela, among other educational institutions.

He has been president of the Asociación de Jóvenes Empresarios de Madrid (AJE, 2017–20) and president of Entrepreneurship at the Confederación de Empresarios de Madrid (CEIM; 2018–20), from where he supported entrepreneurs to face the challenges of the pandemic.

== Professional career ==
After working for several companies, in 2007 he founded the agency Royal Comunicación. The group is present in Finland and Colombia. Royal Comunicación is a partner of Google, Meta, and TikTok, and is an official collaborator of the Observatorio Vodafone.

As a professional in the digital sector, he has given conferences and seminars at the Digital Marketing Congress in Jaén, Plasencia, Ecofin (Emprendedoras con alma), CEIM and the family business, Hosteltur, Club Financiero Génova, Puro Marketing Day, and others.

He is a member of the jury for the Best in Travel Awards, and the TOP5 Excellence digital marketing Awards.

== Publications ==
- From 0 to 3.0 Digital Marketing. Ediciones Punto Didot, 2015.
- "Digital Marketing Actions that achieve higher user acquisition and loyalty: An Analytical Study" Futuro Internet 2019, 11(6), 130.
- The use of the shopping cart: the problem of abandonment in e-commerce" Springer 2022 ISBN 978-3-031-05728-1
