= Cristina García-Orcoyen Tormo =

Spanish politician (born 1948)

Member of the European Parliament
- In office 20 July 1999 – 19 July 2004
- Parliamentary group: Group of the European People's Party (Christian Democrats) and European Democrats
- Constituency: Spain

Personal details
- Born: 2 January 1948 (age 78) Madrid, Spain
- Party: People's Party
- Education: Complutense University of Madrid; IESE Business School; EOI Business School
- Occupation: Environmentalist

Cristina García-Orcoyen Tormo (born 2 January 1948) is a Spanish People's Party politician and environmentalist who served a single term as a Member of the European Parliament (MEP) in the European Parliament between 1999 and 2004. She was the general secretary of the World Wide Fund for Nature in Spain (WWF/Adena) from 1983 to 1996 and was made head of the private non-profit Environment Foundation in 1996. Tormo worked on several directives and community initiatives relating to the environment, industrial and foreign policy when she was an elected member of the European Parliament.

== Biography ==
Tormo was born in Madrid, Spain, on 2 January 1948. She obtained a degree in Political and Economic Sciences from the Complutense University of Madrid and has an MBA in Business Management and Business Administration from Madrid's IESE Business School. Tormo also graduated from the EOI Business School in Madrid with a diploma in Foreign Trade.

Between 1983 and 1996, she was the general secretary of the World Wide Fund for Nature in Spain (WWF/Adena). During this period, Tormo came to notice environmental awareness in Spain, working to conserve the natural environment, especially in areas such as biodiversity and conserving ecosystems. She was a representative of the association in the International Union for Conservation of Nature, the Committee for Latin America of the World Wide Fund for Nature, the General Assembly of the World Fund for Conservation of Nature and Spain's National Environment Council. She was a member of the European Consultative Forum on the Environment from 1992 to 1995 and its vice-chair between 1992 and 1994. Tormo was elected to the position of vice-president of the European Union Environment Advisory Council in either 1993 or 1994 and retained the role until 1996.

In 1996, Tormo became the head of the private non-profit Environment Foundation that promotes integration of the management of its environmental aspects, such as sustainable development, into Spanish business strategies. From 1996 to 1999, she was a member of the board of both Ence and the INITEC. Tormo promoted the foundation of the Spanish Committee of the United Nations Environment Programme in 1996, and in 1998, became a member of the Environment and Industry Programme at the University of Cambridge as well as the Scientific Council of Sustainability of the United Kingdom. She received the 1999 National Environment Award in the "Lucas Mallada of Economy and Environment" category from the Ministry of Environment.

At the 1999 European Parliament election in Spain, Tormo was elected to the European Parliament to serve the constituency of Spain as a member of the People's Party serving in the Group of the European People's Party (Christian Democrats) and European Democrats, taking up her seat on 20 July 1999. While in the European Parliament, she worked on several directives and community initiatives relating to the environment, industrial and foreign policy. Tormo was a participant in the weekly radio programme Un mundo con dos voces in which there was analysis and debate of current political and social concerns with someone in public life in Catalonia. She was on the Committee on the Environment, Public Health and Consumer Policy, the Delegation for relations with the countries of South-east Europe, the Delegation for relations with the Palestinian Legislative Council, the Delegation to the European Economic Area Joint Parliamentary Committee and the Temporary committee on improving safety at sea.

Tormo was a substitute for the Committee on Development and Cooperation, the Committee on Women's Rights and Equal Opportunities, the Delegation to the EU-Hungary Joint Parliamentary Committee, Committee on Foreign Affairs, Human Rights, Common Security and Defence Policy, the Temporary committee on foot and mouth disease, the Committee on Industry, External Trade, Research and Energy and the Delegation to the EU-Turkey Joint Parliamentary Committee. She got the Best Environmental Initiative Award from Garrigues & Andersen in 2001, and received the Award for the best Professional Career in Defense of the Environment from the National Environment Congress in 2002. Tormo later earned the Parliamentary Proceedings Award "for the best European initiative for Environmental Protection and reduction of emissions into the atmosphere" in December 2003, and the Prize for the best parliamentary career of the year in the area of the Environment from the Congress of Deputies in 2004. She left the European Parliament on 19 July 2004, and has been a Member of the Advisory Council on Sustainable Development of Garrigues & Andersen since 2007.
