= NYA International =

- Formerly: Neil Young Associates
- Company type: Private company
- Industry: Crisis management
- Founded: 1990; 36 years ago
- Defunct: 2018
- Fate: Acquired
- Successor: Crisis24 a GardaWorld company
- Headquarters: London, United Kingdom
- Area served: Worldwide
- Products: kidnap-prevention consultancy, contingency planning, crisis prevention and response
- Website: nyainternational.com at the Wayback Machine (archived November 30, 2016)

NYA International was a British risk and strategic consulting firm specializing in security and crisis prevention. It operated worldwide with headquarters in London, United Kingdom and had regional offices in New York City, United States and Singapore. The company's consulting services included incident and crisis response, security risk management and crisis management. It was acquired by Crisis24 in 2018.

== History ==
NYA International was formed in 1990 as Neil Young Associates, a specialist advisory on kidnap for ransom and marine piracy incidents. In 2005, the company responded to one of the first hijackings by Somali pirates in the Gulf of Aden. In 2007 Neil Young Associates was bought by protective security services provider AmorGroup, before becoming NYA International and part of Aon. In 2015 the company successfully separated from Aon to become independent.

NYA International expanded its global footprint by opening regional offices in New York City, United States and Singapore in 2016. In 2017 the company's board appointed Sir Graham Boyce, the United Kingdom's former ambassador to Qatar, Kuwait and Egypt as chairman.

In 2018 it was acquired by Crisis24 a GardaWorld company.

== Services ==
NYA International's consulting services are broken down into three key areas: incident and crisis response, security risk management and crisis management. The company responds to a number of security related incidents including cyber attack or extortion, kidnap for ransom, malicious product tampering, marine piracy and terrorist attacks. Since 2010 NYA International has been retained by C.V. Starr & Co. (Starr Companies) and since 2011 by American International Group, Inc. for crisis prevention and response services. In 2017 the company partnered with Norwegian Hull Club to offer response support to holders of their Marine Cyber Threat and Extortion insurance.

The company also provides consulting services to organisations and individuals directly, and has worked with a number of industries worldwide. In 2016 NYA International was selected by BRAC, an international development organisation based in Bangladesh and the largest non-government organisation in the world, to conduct a security risk assessment of their organisation.
