= Og Mandino =

American writer

- Born: Augustine Mandino II; December 12, 1923; Natick, Massachusetts, United States
- Died: September 3, 1996 (aged 72); Antrim, New Hampshire, United States
- Occupation: writer
- Website: ogmandino.com

Augustine "Og" Mandino II (December 12, 1923 – September 3, 1996) was an American writer. The author of The Greatest Salesman in the World, his books have sold over 50 million copies and have been translated into over 25 languages. He was the president of Success Unlimited magazine until 1976 and was inducted into the National Speakers Association's Hall of Fame.

== Life and career ==
According to the 1930 U.S. Census, Mandino was born in Natick, Massachusetts, on December 12, 1923, to parents Silvio and Margaret Mandino. He was named Augustine after his Italian paternal grandfather.

Mandino edited his high school paper and planned to attend the University of Missouri's journalism school. In 1940, before he entered college, his mother died from a massive heart attack. He worked in a paper factory until 1942. Afterward, he joined the United States Army Air Corps where he became a military officer and a bombardier. He flew for 30 bombing missions over Germany on board a B-24 Liberator during World War II. During this time, he flew with fellow pilot and movie star James Stewart.

After his military duties, Mandino became an insurance salesman. One wintry November morning in Cleveland, he contemplated committing suicide. But as he sorted through several books in a library, volumes of self-help, success and motivation books captured his attention. He selected some titles, went to a table and began reading. He followed his visit to the library with more visits to many other libraries around the United States. He read hundreds of books that dealt with success, a pastime that helped him alleviate his alcoholism. It was in a library in Concord, New Hampshire, where he found W. Clement Stone's classic, Success Through a Positive Mental Attitude, a book that changed Mandino's life.

The author's biographical information with this book indicated that Stone was the owner of the Combined Insurance Company. Mandino decided to obtain a sales position with the company when he was 32 years old. Within a year, Mandino was promoted to sales manager and breaking sales records. A pamphlet that he wrote concerning sales in rural markets got him a job in promotional writing and a position on W. Clement Stone's magazine Success Unlimited. By 1966, Mandino was Executive Editor of the magazine and helped edit an anthology of articles from the magazine, A Treasury of Success Unlimited.

Mandino eventually became a successful writer and speaker. His works were inspired by the Bible and influenced by Napoleon Hill, W. Clement Stone, and Emmet Fox. He was inducted into the National Speakers Association Speaker Hall of Fame.

== Philosophy ==
Mandino's main philosophical message is that every person on earth is a miracle and should choose to direct their life with confidence and congruent to the laws that govern abundance. He claimed that all successful people take on their own lives by "charting" or consciously choosing both the desired destination and the path to reach it.

== Writings ==
- A Treasury of Success Unlimited (Editor, Hawthorn Books, 1966)
- The Greatest Salesman in the World (Frederick Fell, 1968; includes The Ten Ancient Scrolls for Success. Re-branded as an illustrated children's book The Greatest Gift in the World, Frederick Fell, 1976)
- U.S. in a Nutshell (Hawthorn, 1971)
- Cycles: the Mysterious Forces that Trigger Events (E.R. Dewey with Mandino, Hawthorn, 1971)
- The Greatest Secret In The World (Frederick Fell, 1972)
- The Greatest Miracle In The World (Frederick Fell, 1975; includes The God Memorandum)
- The Gift Of Acabar (with Buddy Kaye, Lippincott, 1978)
- The Christ Commission (Lippincott, 1980; speculative fiction novel)
- The Greatest Success In The World (Bantam, 1981)
- Og Mandino's University of Success (Bantam, 1982; compilation of other works)
- The Choice (Bantam, 1984)
- Mission: Success! (Bantam, 1986)
- The Greatest Salesman In The World Part II: The End Of The Story (Bantam, 1988)
- A Better Way To Live (Bantam, 1990; Best-Seller)
- The Return Of The Ragpicker (Bantam, 1992; includes For the Rest of My Life ..., "a powerful declaration of self-affirmation that one could read in six minutes or less" (from Greatest Mystery))
- The Twelfth Angel (Ballantine, 1993)
- The Spellbinder's Gift (Ballantine, 1994)
- Secrets For Success And Happiness (Ballantine, 1995)
- The Greatest Mystery in the World (Ballantine, 1997; includes Advice From Heaven: The Eight Rungs of Life's Ladder)
