= Success (magazine) =

American business magazine

- The June/July 2008 issue
- Categories: Business magazine
- Frequency: Monthly
- Circulation: 500,000+
- Publisher: Success
- Founded: 1897
- Company: Success Partners L.P.
- Country: United States
- Based in: Dallas, Texas
- Language: English
- Website: www.success.com
- ISSN: 0745-2489

Success is a business magazine in the United States published by Success Enterprises, LLC a subsidiary of eXp World Holdings, Inc. According to the company, the magazine "focuses on people who take full responsibility for their own development and income", and provides personal and professional development.

== History ==
Success was established in 1897 by Orison Swett Marden as a way to promote "New Thought Philosophy", which taught positive thinking, life skills, and discipline. That magazine continued until 1911 when it merged with The National Post. The magazine was revived as the New Success in 1918, and then re-adopted the title Success in 1921; the magazine was published until 1927, being replaced by New Age Illustrated at that time.

During its early years, Success contained literary contributions of several notable New Thought writers such as Napoleon Hill, Samuel Merwin and W. Clement Stone.

== Success Unlimited ==
In 1954, the influential American businessman, philanthropist, and self-help writer W. Clement Stone launched the magazine Success Unlimited in collaboration with Napoleon Hill. Contributors to the magazine included Hill, Norman Vincent Peale, Harold Sherman, Preston Bradley, and Ben Sweetland. In words of the Executive Editor, Og Mandino, the magazine sought to inform its readers how to become a "whole person - not just wealthy, but also healthy, happy and wise."

The magazine changed its name to Success in 1981. It remained in publication until 2001, ceasing publication shortly before Stone's death in 2002. The magazine was restarted in 2008 by a Texas businessman.

== Relaunch ==
Success was acquired by VideoPlus L.P. in 2007. VideoPlus, established in 1987, produces educational and marketing materials for the direct selling industry, as well as sponsored and custom publications.

The April/May 2008 issue marked the relaunch of Success as a bi-monthly magazine. Success moved to a monthly print schedule in September 2008.

In December 2020, Success Enterprises, LLC was acquired by eXp World Holdings, Inc.
