= The Greatest Salesman in the World =

Book by Og Mandino

- Author: Og Mandino
- Publisher: Bantam Books
- Publication date: 1968
- Media type: Print
- Pages: 111
- ISBN: 0-553-27757-X
- OCLC: 27780187

The Greatest Salesman in the World is a book written by Og Mandino, that serves as a guide to a philosophy of salesmanship and success, telling the story of Hafid, a poor camel boy who achieves a life of abundance. The book was first published in 1968, and reissued in 1983 by Bantam. A hardcover edition was published by Buccaneer Books in June 1993. In 1970, the Success Motivation Institute purchased the rights to produce the audio recording.

The book advises readers to form good habits, because "Good habits are the key to all success," and bad habits lead to failure.

The book instructs readers to read Scroll I (Chapter 8) three times a day for thirty days straight. According to the book, only after completing the thirty days of reading Scroll I should the reader continue to Scroll II (Chapter 9) and so forth through Scroll X (Chapter 17). If Mandino's suggested reading structure is followed, it would take about 10 months to read the book.

== Quotes ==
"You were not created for a life of idleness. You cannot eat from sunrise to sunset or drink or play or make love. Work is not your enemy but your friend. If all manners of labor were forbidden to thee you would fall to your knees and beg an early death."

To learn and master anything, one has to pay the price in time and concentration, until it becomes part of one’s personality and habit in living.

No other trade or profession has more opportunity for one to rise from poverty to great wealth than that of salesman.

Rewards are great if one succeeds but the rewards are great only because so few succeed.

Obstacles are necessary for success because in selling, as in all careers of importance, victory comes only after many struggles and countless defeats.

== The Greatest Salesman in the World part two, the end of the story ==
This is a sequel to Mandino's 1967 bestselling book, published in 1988 and set fourteen years later than the first part; the main character Hafid is in a sad state, mourning the loss of his wife, Lisha. The story starts years into Hafid’s seclusion, when a dream convinces him to see a stranger that turns up on his doorstep and pulls Hafid out of retirement to embark on a new adventure: a speaking tour to enlighten others about the principles enclosed in The Ten Scrolls.
