= Rexair =

American vacuum cleaner manufacturer

Rexair LLC
- Type: Private subsidiary of Rhône Group
- Industry: Manufacturing
- Founded: 1932
- Headquarters: Troy, Michigan
- Products: Vacuum Cleaners
- Owner: Rhône Group
- Website: www.rainbowsystem.com www.rexairllc.com

Rexair LLC is an American manufacturer of vacuum cleaners based in Troy, Michigan. Rexair is predominantly known for its production and marketing of a home cleaning system that uses water as its primary filter.

Along with its corporate headquarters in Troy, Rexair also has a manufacturing facility in Cadillac, Michigan.

== History ==
In the early 1920s, John W. Newcombe invented a device that separated dust and particulates from the air. He called his new invention the "Newcombe Separator". The Newcombe Separator has a cup-shaped part at its center that spins at high speed, creating centrifugal force. Air can be pulled through holes in the separator, while anything with weight is effectively thrown outward from the separator, trapping it in the bottom of the machine. This air-cleaning device led to changes in the method of collecting dust and contaminants from the home and workplace.

It was quickly discovered, however, that cleaning the air was only taking care of a small percentage of the problem of indoor air pollution; the larger percentage of dust and debris in a room "settles" onto surfaces and any movement through that room would stir the dust and contaminants back up and into the air. Further research proved that by removing the contaminants at their source, they could effectively stop the cycle of stirring dust and contaminants up into the air every time there was movement in the room.

By the late 1920s, Leslie H. Green joined forces with Newcombe to develop the "Newcombe Bagless". In 1929, Green formed a new corporation. They named it Rexair, meaning "King of the Air". While the nation was in the midst of the Great Depression, the Rexair Company began producing, refining and marketing the Rexair Cleaner.

In 1936, T. Russ Hill joined Rexair. Inspired by street cleaners in Kentucky, Hill came up with the idea of incorporating water into the Rexair design, claiming that this would trap dust and dirt. Rexair developed a new slogan: "Wet Dust Can't Fly!" By the late 1930s, medical professionals recognized it as a breakthrough product for allergy and hay fever sufferers.

In 1941, Rexair merged with the Martin-Parry Corporation of Toledo, Ohio, providing Rexair with expanded manufacturing capabilities. During the war, Rexair and Martin-Parry produced radar cases, rocket launchers and ship partitions and linings to aid the war effort.

Around 1948, J. V. "Sandy" Sanders (a salesman from Owensboro, Kentucky) saw a demonstration of the Rexair and came to Detroit, Michigan, determined to become "The best salesman the company ever had!". In 1953, "Sandy" became one of five Regional Managers in Rexair's newly aligned national sales organization.

A newly designed Rexair Cleaner was released in 1955 with a motor allegedly twice as powerful as its predecessor. Rexair executives rechristened it the "Rainbow" with one ad reading, "Now your home can be fresh as a rainbow".

In 1969, Rexair opened a 100,000 square foot manufacturing facility in Cadillac, Michigan. New attachments were developed: the Power Nozzle and AquaMate, among others. The new Rainbow D3 was launched in 1980, the first major model change in twenty years. The D3 was the first Rainbow approved for "wet pick-up".

In 1959, Sanders and Associates purchased Rexair. J. V. Sanders was now in control of Rexair. He attempted to develop what he called the "Rainbow Opportunity".

As early as 1947, Rexair had branch locations in Canada, Cuba and Mexico. In the 1980s, Rexair developed an international sales and distribution network, and the Rainbow was modified to meet the specific demands of countries around the world. In 1986, Rexair celebrated its Golden Anniversary by launching its newest Rainbow, the D4.

In 2001, Paul Vidovich took charge of Rexair, as president and CEO, and in 2002, he also assumed the responsibilities of chairman. Paul began his career in the business in 1971. He rose through the ranks via the direct selling business.

In 2015, Rexair LLC was owned by public company Jarden. In April 2016, Jarden was purchased by Newell-Rubbermaid and the companies were merged. Newell Brands was now the owner of Rexair LLC. Newell Brands is a publicly held company.

On 26 February 2019 Newell Brands announced it would be selling its Rexair business, the maker of Rainbow vacuum products, to private-equity firm Rhone Capital. Financial terms of the deal were not disclosed.

On June 16, 2020, Rexair announced recalls to their Repair Rainbow SRX Vacuums due to fire and burn hazards.

== Product ==
The product is a vacuum cleaner based on water instead of a reservoir to filter dust and dirt while vacuuming. The Rainbow system traps dust and dirt in the water and allows clean "water washed" air to travel through the air path and out the exhaust. From 1936 to current production, there have been several models produced with some having different versions within the models and attachments.

The table below only shows information on United States models. Other countries have slight changes within the model number to separate from the voltage use as well as other specific country requirements.

Model	Series	Version	Year
RHCS19	SRX	NA	2019
E2 Type 12	Black	2	2012
E2 Type 12	Black	1	2011
E2 Type 12	Silver	NA	2008
E2 Type 12	Gold	2	2006
E2 Type 12	Gold	1	2004
E-2	e SERIES	2	2000
E-2	e SERIES	1	1998
D4C	SE	2	1994
D4C	SE	1	1990
D4C	NA	NA	1986
D3C	NA	NA	1982
D3A	NA	NA	1980
D2A	NA	NA	1979
D2	NA	NA	1974
D	Chrome	NA	1961
D	Gold	NA	1955
C	NA	NA	1950
B	Black Diamond	NA	1946
3	NA	NA	1941
NA	A	NA	1936

== Sales ==
Sanders restructured the company to focus on direct marketing of its products via independent contractors or independently owned distributors. Rexair's independent distributors and their independent dealers may use direct marketing techniques such as door to door lead generation or the use of referral gathering to get their leads. The main promotional tool it advocates is labeled as "Talent Scouting" which is recruiting a prospect to join the organization as a salesperson and a person who can "scout (more) talent". Once a lead is generated, salespeople will attempt to contact this lead to schedule an appointment to show the Rainbow Cleaning System (sometimes called a vacuum, sometimes called an air filter). Rexair has been issued a certificate from the Association of Home Appliance Manufacturers (AHAM), [officially adding to] the title of vacuum cleaner, "air filter". A prospect is offered a gift, if they offer to give the salesperson more referrals. Rexair teaches sales and marketing techniques through corporate distributor developers and through training seminars. CEO Paul Vidovich and his staff travel the world educating distributors on developing the Rainbow business.

Rexair manufactures sales promotional tools and sells them to their independent distributors.
