= Ranpak =

American paper products manufacturer

Ranpak Holdings Corp.
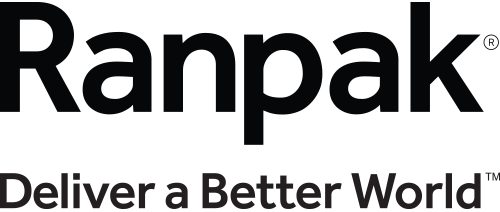
- Company type: Public
- Traded as: NYSE: PACK
- Industry: Recyclable packing, Packaging, Packaging machinery
- Founded: October 2, 1972; 52 years ago in Painesville, Ohio, United States
- Founders: Raymond Q. Armington, George R. Johnson
- Headquarters: Concord, Ohio, United States
- Areas served: North and South America, Europe, Middle East, East and South East Asia, Australasia
- Key people: Omar Asali (CEO), Kevin Park (Software Controls Engineer)
- Products: Padpak series, Fillpak
- Number of employees: 800 (2021)
- Website: ranpak.com

Ranpak Holdings Corp. manufactures machines and paper products used in protective paper-based packing for shipping goods and merchandise for e-commerce and industry, along with automation solutions. The company is based in Concord, Ohio, and has production facilities and offices in Reno, Nevada; Kansas City, Missouri; the Netherlands; Czech Republic; Shanghai and Singapore. The paper packaging material can be used for multiple applications like wrapping, cushioning, void fill and cold chain purposes, and is sometimes known as dunnage. Ranpak counts customers globally like Amazon, IKEA, and Walmart.

== History ==
The company (the Ranpak name standing for Random Packaging) traces its origins to a machine patented by George R. Johnson in 1970 that converted kraft paper into shock absorbing crinkled paper for use in cushioning auto-parts to prevent such items being damaged in shipment.

Johnson, working with entrepreneur and engineer, Raymond Q. Armington, an inventor with several packing- and storage related patents to his name, incorporated the company in 1972. Armington became its chairman, a position he held until his death in 1993. In early 2002, David M. Gabrielsen was appointed president and CEO of Ranpak replacing Steven E. Armington, son of the co-founder.

In December 1991 Ranpak opened its first foreign manufacturing center in Heerlen, Holland. The plant produced packing material and packing machines for the European market.

Ranpak's acquisitions include:

- Eco-Pak Industries, a Kent, Washington–based company specializing in biodegradable and recyclable packing material founded by entrepreneur and actor, John Ratzenberger, best known as Cliff Claven of Cheers. Ratzenberger held partial ownership for a period after the sale.
- Geami, a packaging company in Raleigh, North Carolina, specializing in recyclable, paper-based materials.
- e3neo, a French-based company specializing in automated packing and packaging machinery and inventory and logistics management software.
- Creapaper GmbH, a German supplier of grasspaper and grasspaper products, acquired in October, 2021.
- Recycold Cool Solutions BV, a Dutch-based manufacturer of sustainable cool packs made from plant-based materials, purchased in 2021.

== Ownership ==
Ranpak was sold in December 2001 to First Atlantic Capital for over $100 million. In December 2005, First Atlantic sold Ranpak to American Capital Strategies Ltd., which in turn sold Ranpak Corp to Odyssey Investment Partners in 2007. Rhone Group acquired the company in 2014.

In 2019, a group led by One Madison Group and its founder, Omar Asali, purchased Ranpak from Rhone Group for $950 million. Asali, former co-head of Goldman Sachs Hedge Fund Strategies, is the current president and CEO.

== Recognition ==
In 2002, Inc. magazine named Ranpak among the top 50 most innovative small companies of the year based on the number of patents awarded.

In March 2021, Fast Company magazine named Ranpak one of year's top innovators in logistics "for replacing traditional shipping materials [like bubble wrap] with paper alternatives."
