= Garrigues (law firm) =

International law firm based in Spain

- Headquarters: Madrid, Spain
- No. of offices: 32 in 13 countries
- No. of employees: 2000 (2014)
- Major practice areas: Corporate law, commercial contracts, mergers and acquisitions, securities markets, banking and finance, insurance, real estate, planning and zoning, energy, telecommunications, labor and employment, litigation and arbitration, restructuring and insolvency, criminal, E.U. and antitrust, tax, accounting, human capital services, intellectual property, informational technology, administrative, environmental, maritime and transportation, pharmaceuticals and biotechnology, sports and entertainment
- Revenue: €443 million (2022)
- Date founded: 1941 (Madrid, Spain)
- Website: www.garrigues.com

Garrigues is a law firm with offices in Spain, Portugal, London, New York, and 9 other countries. Founded in 1941, the firm has experience in a wide range of fields and industries, from traditional practice areas to the newest legal fields. As of July 2015, Garrigues was the second largest law firm in turnover in Continental Europe.

== Founders ==
In 1941, two brothers, Joaquín and Antonio Garrigues Díaz-Cañabate, founded J&A Garrigues.

Born in 1899, Joaquín Garrigues Díaz-Cañabate became a professor of commercial law at age 29. According to the Garrigues company’s website, he oversaw reforms to Spanish company law in 1944 at the Institute of Political Rights, he founded the Revista de Derecho Comercial (Commercial Law Review) in 1946, and soon after he prepared the draft legislation that would become the Spanish Corporations Law (1951) and the Limited Liability Companies Law.

The younger brother, Antonio Garrigues Díaz-Cañabate, was born in 1904. He practiced law until his appointment in 1931 as director-general of registries and notaries during the days of the Spanish Republic. He was ambassador to the United States (1962–64) and to the Vatican (1964–72), and he became the minister of justice in the first government of the returned Spanish monarchy (1975–76).

== History ==
The company says that “During the second half of the 20th century, J&A Garrigues played an active role in Spanish legal life and played host to reforms to the country’s legislation, particularly during the transition to democracy, placing the firm in an ideal position to dominate the legal services market.”

In 1997 it merged with Arthur Andersen, Asesores Legales y Tributarios (ALT) and became Garrigues & Andersen. In March 2002, with the disappearance of the Andersen Worldwide network, the firm became independent, and today it operates under the name of Garrigues.

In 1991 the company set up the Portuguese Legal Group, along with other firms from Portugal, Brazil and the United Kingdom. Garrigues’s Portuguese practice has been operating since January 2005 through Garrigues Portugal, which incorporated the firm Leónidas, Matos & Associados. In 2013, Garrigues took the first step towards opening its own office network in Latin America. In 2017, Fernando Vives was re-elected executive chairman of Garrigues for five-year term.

== See also ==
- Pérez-Llorca
