= Mey Eden =

Israeli bottled water company

- Product type: Spring water
- Current owner: Eden Springs
- Markets: Israel (TASE: MEYD)
- Website: http://www.meyeden.co.il/

Mey Eden (Hebrew: מי עדן, literally "Waters of Eden", also known as "Mayanot Eden" or "Mei Eden") is the brand name of the company Eden Springs Ltd., which is an Israeli bottled mineral water marketing company.

Mey Eden is a leading mineral water company in Israel. The brand and company were created in 1980 after development of the Salukia wellspring in Katzrin, Golan Heights. After additional tests with the wellspring water, Mey Eden received permission to market its water in 1983. Mey Eden has also started to product water coolers, water container holders as well as eco-friendly disposable cups made with compostable plant-based materials. Organisations boycotting purchases of produce from Israeli-occupied territories have from time to time boycotted Mey Eden water.

Mey Eden was sold to Rhone Capitol in July, 2013.
