= Twentieth Century Encyclopedia of Catholicism =

Cover of Promotional Pamphlet from Hawthorn Books (c. 1958)

The Twentieth Century Encyclopedia of Catholicism is a series of 150 volumes examining topics pertaining to Catholicism, many of them originally published in France. It was published in English in the United States by Hawthorn Books from 1958 to 1971. The series editor was Henri Daniel-Rops. The series was divided into 16 sections. In the United States, volumes were published individually over a number of years and made available for sale separately.

== Background Information ==
=== General ===
The Twentieth Century Encyclopedia of Catholicism was intended to cover every aspect of the Catholic faith. Most of the authors occupied major posts in Catholic universities. Because most of the participating authors were European, the books were translated into English under the supervision of Lancelot Sheppard. The resulting works were approved by separate editorial boards in the United States and England. The individual books were also reviewed by officials of the Catholic Church, who granted the Church's imprimatur to each volume.

This series of books was originally planned to comprise 150 volumes organized into 15 sections encompassing general topics such as belief, faith, the nature of man, the Bible, etc. However, when completed, the series consisted of 16 sections; this was accomplished by reducing the size of the planned section covering Catholicism and the Arts from 13 volumes to 6 volumes, and creating an additional section for Catholicism and Science that consisted of 8 volumes. Ultimately the series consisted of 148 works of scholarship, as well as a "double-sized" index that was assigned two volume numbers.

The contemporary reaction to The Twentieth Century Encyclopedia of Catholicism was quite favorable. Besides the Catholic press and academics praising the series, the secular Saturday Review proclaimed it, "An enterprise of great scope in the intellectual and spiritual life of contemporary Catholicism." The series was awarded the Thomas More Association Medal "for the most distinguished contribution to Catholic publishing in 1958."

=== Publication ===
Hawthorn Books made an announcement in January 1958 that it was preparing to publish a new Catholic encyclopedia. The firm advised that it was planning on releasing the English language version of a French Catholic encyclopedia currently being published; at that time, 40 volumes of the French version were already in print. Instead of using the large folio format typically used in encyclopedias, the individual volumes were published in the much smaller octavo format, each about 125-150 pages in length. Each volume, while germane to the topic of its section, was meant to be self-contained with its own citations and bibliography.

The production was intended to be an international effort: with the books published in the U.S. by Hawthorn Books, in Canada by McClelland & Stewart Ltd, in Great Britain by Burnes Oates and Washbourne, in France by Librairie Arthème Fayard, and in Germany by Paul Pattlock Verlag. However, it is unknown if the publishing ventures besides those in the United States and France occurred.

The books within the series were planned to be published over a period of 75 months. Subscribers could purchase them at a rate of two-books-a-month for $5.00. If purchased individually, the books were sold for $3.50 each. The order in which the volumes were published did not coincide with the volume numbers within the series; for example, the first book published, What is the Bible?, was actually assigned volume #60 within the structure of the encyclopedia.

Publication of The Twentieth Century Encyclopedia of Catholicism started in September 1958 and by December 1964, 128 of the volumes had been published. However, production of the series took longer than planned and not all of the initially projected books were published. The final volume, the index, was not published until 1971. Also, while most of the volumes of the encyclopedia (94 by September 1962) were published before the beginning of the Second Vatican Council, some were published after the conclusion of that ecumenical council and reflect its influence.

=== Senior Editorial Team ===
All four of the men that formed the senior editorial team were well-established Catholic authors, academics, and editors.

- Henri Daniel-Rops, Editor-in-Chief
- Lancelot C. Sheppard, English Supervising Editor
- Brother Celestine Luke, F.S.C., S.T.D., American Consulting Editor and Chief of Consultants
- Joseph W. Sprug, Editor of the Index

== Organization of the Encyclopedia ==
The Twentieth Century Encyclopedia of Catholicism was divided into sixteen sections, each of which was intended to explore a topic within the Catholic faith more deeply. The table below lists the sections and their topics.

Sections of The Twentieth Century Encyclopedia of Catholicism
Section	Topic	Section	Topic
I	Knowledge and Faith	IX	The Church and the Modern World
II	The Basic Truths	X	The Worship of the Church
III	The Nature of Man	XI	Catholicism and Literature
IV	The Means of Redemption	XII	Catholicism and the Arts
V	The Life of Faith	XIII	Catholicism and Science
VI	The Word of God	XIV	Outside the Church
VII	The History of the Church	XV	Non-Christian Beliefs
VIII	The Organization of the Church	XVI	General and Supplementary Volumes

=== Section I. Knowledge and Faith ===
Listing of Volumes Published for Section I
Volume	Title	Author(s)	Date	Publication Order
1	The Achievements of Vatican II	Hollis, Christopher	Feb-67	141
2	Is Theology a Science?	Chenu, Marie-Dominique; Green-Armytage; Adrian Howell North	1959	23
3	The Meaning of Tradition	Congar, Yves	1964	126
4	What is Dogma?	Journet, Charles	Jul-64	121
5	Do Dogmas Change?	Rondet, Henri	May-61	65
6	What is Faith?	Joly, Eugène	Sep-58	2
7	The Debate on Birth Control	Bauer, Andrew (ed)	1969	148
8	Myth or Mystery?	Daniélou, Jean	Jun-68	145
9	Revelation and Reason	Broglie, Guy de	1965	131
10	Is There a Christian Philosophy?	Nédoncelle, Maurice	Apr-60	39
11	The Origins of Christian Philosophy	Tresmontant, Claude	Jan-63	99
12	Medieval Christian Philosophy	Delhaye, Philippe	1960	45
13	The Basis of Belief	Trethowan, Illtyd	Feb-61	59
14	Christianity and Science	Abelé, Jean	Oct-61	76
15	The God of Reason	Jolivet, Régis	Nov-58	6

=== Section II. The Basic Truths ===
Listing of Volumes Published for Section II
Volume	Title	Author(s)	Date	Publication Order
16	The Worship of God	Philippe, M.-D. (Marie-Dominique)	Sep-59	26
17	What is the Trinity?	Piault, Bernard.	Feb-59	11
18	The Holy Spirit	Henry, Antonin Marcel	Oct-60	51
19	The Creation	Mouiren, Trophime	Dec-62	98
20	The Problem of Evil	Petit, François, O. Praem	Sep-59	25
21	Who is the Devil?	Cristiani, Léon	Oct-58	4
22	Freedom and Providence	Pontifex, Mark	Sep-60	49
23	The Theology of Grace	Daujat, Jean	May-59	18
24	What is the Incarnation?	Ferrier, Francis,	Jul-62	90
25	What is Redemption?	Philippe de la Trinité, Father	Sep-61	72
26	The Communion of Saints	Lamirande, Émilien	Jan-63	100
27	Faith, Hope and Charity	Bars, Henry	May-61	66
28	Life After Death	Becqué, Maurice, and Becqué, Louis	Aug-60	48

=== Section III. The Nature of Man ===
Listing of Volumes Published for Section III
Volume	Title	Author(s)	Date	Publication Order
29	The Origins of Man	Cristiani, Léon	Nov-58	5
30	Evolution	Collin, Rémy	Nov-59	29
31	What is Man?	Le Trocquer, René	Feb-61	60
32	What is Life?	Biot, René	Mar-59	13
33	Personal Responsibility	Lawlor, Monica Mary	Nov-63	111
34	Man in His Environment	Folliet, Joseph	Sep-63	108
35	Man and Metaphysics	Jolivet, Régis	Aug-61	71
36	Psychical Phenomena	Omez, Réginald	Dec-58	7

=== Section IV. The Means of Redemption ===
Listing of Volumes Published for Section IV
Volume	Title	Author(s)	Date	Publication Order
37	Prayer	Daujat, Jean	Dec-64	127
38	The Nature of Mysticism	Knowles, David	Oct-66	138
39	Spiritual Writers of the Early Church	Cayré, Fulbert	Jan-59	10
40	Spiritual Writers of the Middle Ages	Sitwell, Gerard, O.S.B.	Sep-61	71
41	Post-Reformation Spirituality	Cognet, Louis	Oct-59	28
42	Spiritual Writers in Modern Times	Sheppard, Lancelot C. (Lancelot Capel)	1967	143
43	True and False Possession	Lhermitte, Jean	Mar-63	101
44	Mary The Mother of God	Suenens, Léon Joseph	Oct-59	27
45	The Devotion to Our Lady	Graef, Hilda C.	Aug-63	106
46	What is a Saint?	Douillet, Jacques	Oct-58	3
47	What is an Angel?	Régamey, P.-R. (Pie-Raymond)	Jan-60	33

=== Section V. The Life of Faith ===
Listing of Volumes Published for Section V
Volume	Title	Author(s)	Date	Publication Order
48	What is the Church?	Bovis, André de	Nov-61	77
49	What is a Sacrament?	Piault, Bernard	Oct-63	110
50	Christian Initiation	McCormack, Arthur	1969	147
51	Penance and Absolution	Barton, John M. T. (John Mackintosh Tilney)	Apr-61	63
52	What is the Eucharist?	Nicolas, Maria Iosephus	Aug-60	47
53	What is a Priest?	Lécuyer, Joseph	Jul-59	21
54	Christian Marriage	Fabrègues, Jean de	Dec-59	31
55	Death and the Christian	Didier, Jean-Charles	Mar-61	61
56	What is Christian Life?	Liégé, Pierre André	Nov-61	78
57	The Enigma of the Stigmata	Biot, René	Dec-62	97
58	Christian Ethics	Hawkins, D. J. B. (Denis John Bernard)	Dec-63	113
59	Christianity and Money	Leclercq, Jacques	May-59	17

=== Section VI. The Word of God ===
Listing of Volumes Published for Section VI
Volume	Title	Author(s)	Date	Publication Order
60	What is the Bible?	Daniel-Rops, Henri	Sep-58	1
61	The Promised Land	Blanchard, Raoul; Du Buit, F. M. (François Michel)	Sep-66	137
62	Biblical Archaeology	Du Buit, F. M. (François Michel)	Dec-60	55
63	Biblical Criticism	Steinmann, Jean	Dec-58	8
64	God's Word At Mass	Koenig, John H.	Jan-67	139
65	The Religion of Israel	Gelin, Albert	1959	16
66	The Prophets	Dheilly, Joseph	1960	56
67	The Sources for the Life of Christ	Amiot, F. (François), P.S.S.; Danielou, Jean, S.J.; Brunot, Amedee, S.C.J.; Daniel-Rops, Henri	Aug-62	92
68	The Life of Our Lord	Daniel-Rops, Henri	Nov-64	125
69	What is the Gospel?	Paupert, Jean-Marie	Oct-62	95
70	St. Paul and His Message	Brunot, Amédée	Jul-59	22
71	The Old Testament Apocrypha	Dimier, Catherine	Jun-64	120
72	The New Testament Apocrypha	Hervieux, Jacques	Nov-60	53
73	Judaism	Démann, Paul	Aug-61	72

=== Section VII. The History of the Church ===
Listing of Volumes Published for Section VII
Volume	Title	Author(s)	Date	Publication Order
74	Christian Beginnings	Zeiller, Jacques	Nov-60	54
75	The Dawn of the Middle Ages	Palanque, Jean-Rémy	Sep-60	50
76	The Early Middle Ages	Guillemain, Bernard	Jul-60	46
77	The Later Middle Ages	Guillemain, Bernard	Jun-60	44
78	The Revolt against the Church	Cristiani, Léon	Jun-62	88
79	The Age of Absolutism	Braure, Maurice	Dec-63	114

=== Section VIII. The Organization of the Church ===
Listing of Volumes Published for Section VIII
Volume	Title	Author(s)	Date	Publication Order
80	What is Canon Law?	Metz, Rene	Jan-60	34
81	The Papacy	Ormesson, Wladimir, comte d'	Feb-59	12
82	The Ecumenical Councils	Dvornik, Francis	Jan-61	57
83	What is a Bishop?	Urtasun, Joseph	Aug-62	91
84	What is a Cardinal?	Lierde, Petrus Canisius van, Bp., and Giraud, Alexandre	Jul-64	122
85	Religions Orders of Men	Canu, Jean	Feb-60	36
86	Religions Orders of Women	Malard, Suzanne	Oct-64	123
87	Secular Institutes	Reidy, Gabriel	May-62	85
88	The Catholic Spirit	Rétif, André	Jun-59	19

=== Section IX. The Church and the Modern World ===
Listing of Volumes Published for Section IX
Volume	Title	Author(s)	Date	Publication Order
89	Church and State	Woodruff, Douglas	Dec-61	79
90	Christianity and Economics	Hollis, Christopher	Jan-61	58
91	Atheism	Borne, Etienne	Jul-61	69
92	Catholicism in English-Speaking Lands	Carthy, M. P. (Mary Peter)	Feb-64	116
93	Psychiatry and the Christian	Dominian, Jack	Sep-62	93
94	Technology and Religion	Queffélec, Henri	Feb-64	115
95	The Christian and World Integration	Leclercq, Jacques	Apr-63	103
96	Christianity and Communism	Chambre, Henri	Apr-60	40
97	Christianity and Colonialism	Delavignette, Robert Louis	Jun-64	119
98	Holiness in Action	Cluny, Roland	Apr-63	104
99	History of the Missions	Vaulx, Bernard de	Apr-61	64
100	Missions in the World Today	Millot, René Pierre	Jul-61	70
101	The Contribution of German Catholicism	Dru, Alexander	Oct-63	109
102	The Church's Mission in the World	Rétif, Louis and Rétif, André Rétif	Apr-62	84
103	The Church and Sex	Trevett, Reginald Frederick	Mar-60	37
104	The Church and the Workingman	Cronin, John F. (John Francis); Flannery, Harry W.	Nov-65	134
105	Christian Charity in Action	Riquet, Michel	Dec-61	80
106	International Morality	Soras, Alfred de	Aug-63	105
107	Why We Believe	Cristiani, Léon	Apr-59	15

=== Section X. The Worship of the Church ===
Listing of Volumes Published for Section X
Volume	Title	Author(s)	Date	Publication Order
108	The Spirit of Worship	Lefebvre, Gaspar, O.S.B	Nov-59	30
109	The Liturgical Books	Sheppard, Lancelot C. (Lancelot Capel)	Oct-62	96
110	History of the Mass	Amiot, F. (François)	Jan-59	9
111	The Mass in the West	Sheppard, Lancelot C. (Lancelot Capel)	Jan-62	82
112	Eastern Liturgies	Dalmais, Irénée Henri	May-60	42
113	The Christian Calendar	Denis-Boulet, Noële M.	Jun-60	43
114	Vestments and Church Furniture	Lesage, Robert	Mar-60	38
115	The Liturgical Movement	By the sacerdotal communities of Saint-Sev́erin of Paris and Saint-Joseph of Nice	Apr-64	118

=== Section XI. Catholicism and Literature ===
Listing of Volumes Published for Section XI
Volume	Title	Author(s)	Date	Publication Order
116	Sacred Languages	Auvray, Paul; Poulain, Pierre; Blaise, Albert,	Feb-60	35
117	Contemporary Christian Writers	Foster, Joseph R.	Nov-63	112
118	Christian Poetry	Jennings, Elizabeth	Apr-65	130
119	Modern Christian Literature	Kranz, Gisbert	Mar-61	62

=== Section XII. Catholicism and the Arts ===
Listing of Volumes Published for Section XII
Volume	Title	Author(s)	Date	Publication Order
120	Church Building	Rykwert, Joseph	Jan-66	136
121	Early Christian Art	Syndicus, Eduard	Jan-62	81
122	Christian Sculpture	Debidour, Victor-Henry	1968	146
123	Modern Christian Art	Wilson, Winefride.	Nov-65	133
124	Christian Theatre	Speaight, Robert	May-60	41
125	Christian Music	Robertson, Alec	Oct-61	75

=== Section XIII. Catholicism and Science ===
Listing of Volumes Published for Section XIII
Volume	Title	Author(s)	Date	Publication Order
126	Linguistics, Language and Religion	Crystal, David	Apr-65	129
127	Cosmology and Christianity	Peach, John Vincent	Aug-65	132
128	Nuclear Physics in Peace and War	Hodgson, P. E. (Peter Edward)	Jun-61	67
129	Medicine and Morals	Marshall, John	Oct-60	52
130	Science and Religion	Chauchard, Paul	Jul-62	89
131	Cybernetics	Moray, Neville	Sep-63	107
132	World Poverty and the Christian	McCormack, Arthur	Mar-63	102
133	Man's Intervention in Nature	Garrigan, Owen	Sep-67	144

=== Section XIV. Outside the Church ===
Listing of Volumes Published for Section XIV
Volume	Title	Author(s)	Date	Publication Order
134	The Contemporary Christian	Corbishley, Thomas	Jan-67	140
135	The Spirit of Eastern Orthodoxy	Le Guillou, M.-J. (Marie-Joseph)	Apr-62	83
136	Heresies and Heretics	Cristiani, Léon	Jun-59	20
137	Protestantism	Tavard, George H. (George Henry)	Dec-59	32
138	Christian Unity	Boyer, Charles	May-62	86
139	Christian Sects	Algermissen, Konrad	Jun-62	87

=== Section XV. Non-Christian Beliefs ===
Listing of Volumes Published for Section XV
Volume	Title	Author(s)	Date	Publication Order
140	Primitive and Prehistoric Religions	Bergounioux, F.-M. (Frédéric-Marie); Goetz, Joseph	Jan-66	135
141	Religions of the Ancient East	Drioton, Étienne	1965	134
142	Greek and Roman Religion	Hus, Alain	Sep-62	94
143	Mohammedanism	Gardet, Louis	Jun-61	68
144	Hinduism	Lemaître, Solange	Aug-59	24
145	Buddhism	Berry, Thomas	Feb-67	142
146	Christianity and Other Religions	Zaehner, R. C. (Robert Charles)	Apr-64	117

=== Section XVI. General and Supplementary Volumes ===
Listing of Volumes Published for Section XVI
Volume	Title	Author(s)	Date	Publication Order	Note
147	What is Society?	Zahn, Gordon C. (Gordon Charles)	Dec-64	128	
148	Law and Morals	St. John-Stevas, Norman	Oct-64	124	
149 & 150	Index	Sprug, Joseph W.	1971		one book assigned two volume numbers

== External references ==
- 20th century encyclopedia of Catholicism
