= UTEX Industries =

Utex Industries, Inc.
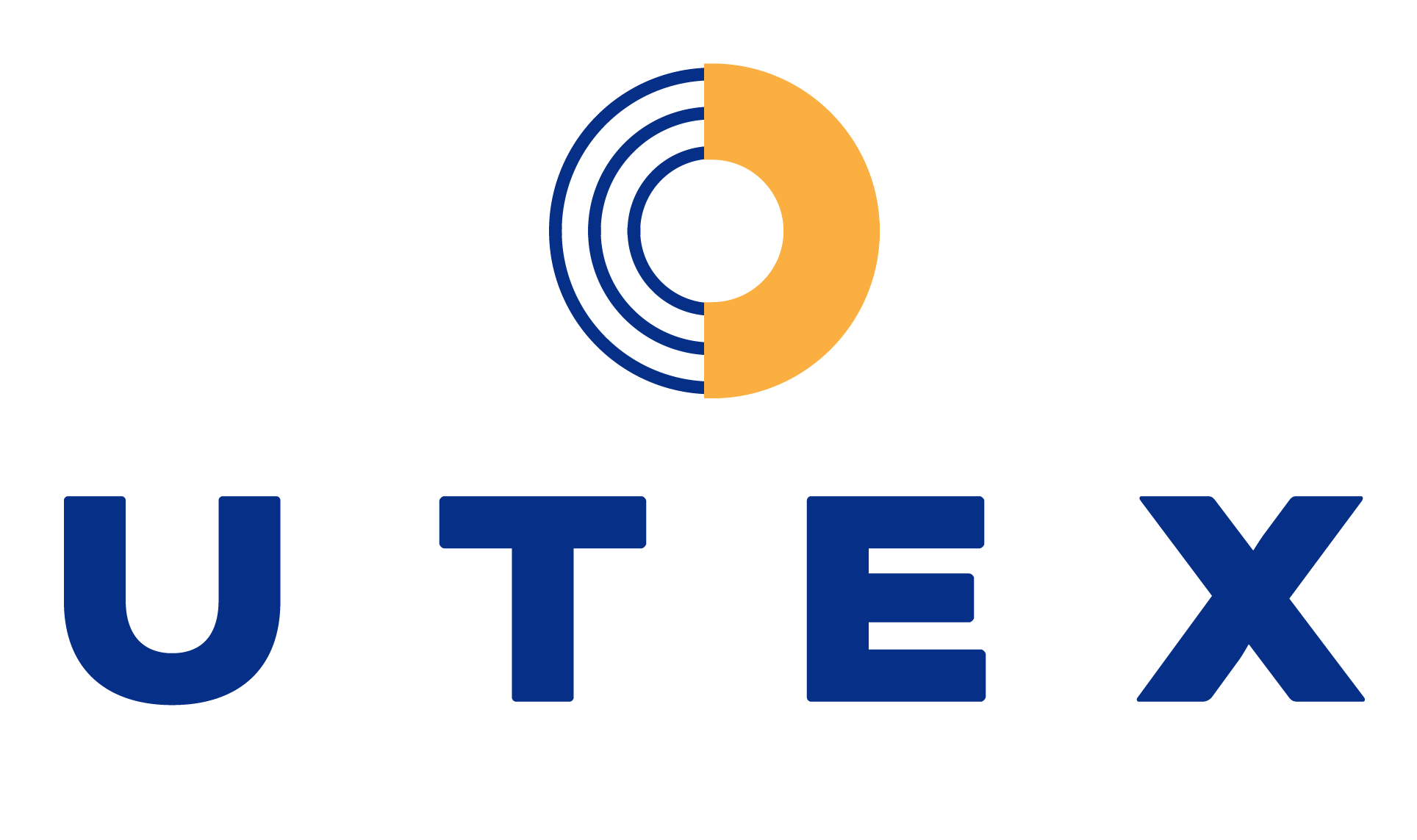
- Industry: Oil & Gas
- Founded: July 2, 1940
- Headquarters: Houston, Texas, United States
- Key people: Piotr Galitzine (CEO), Wellon Pierre (VP of Operations), Chuck Moore (Operations Manager)
- Products: specialized seals. and related equipment.
- Brands: XLU, Core-X, XLFE
- Number of employees: Over 500
- Divisions: Utex Corporate Headquarters, Utex Weimar, Utex Accuseal, Utex Conroe, Utex North, Utex West, Utex Mansfield, Utex Tulsa, Utex Lawrence, Utex Montoursville, Utex Odessa, Utex San Antonio, Utex Colorado, Utex Singapore PTE LTD, Utex Technologies SDN BHD,
- Subsidiaries: Accuseal, Applied Rubber Technology, Arefco, SteelTex Fabricators

UTEX Industries, Inc. is an American manufacturer of sealing products.

Based in Houston, Texas, the company was founded as Universal Packing and Gasket in 1940 and was renamed to UTEX Industries in 1969. Grey Mountain Partners purchased UTEX in 2005 and sold it in 2007 to Audax Group, which sold it to Rhône Group in 2010. Private equity firm Riverstone Holdings purchased UTEX Industries for $825 million in 2013.

== History ==
UTEX Industries was founded in 1940 as Universal Packing and Gasket. It is based in Houston, Texas.

In 1964, the company created "the first nonadjustable plunger packing material designed to address reciprocating pump-sealing problems". Made of nitrile rubber and "nylon fabric composite laminated material", it was formed into "packing" named the J-Design 838. In 1969, UP&G was renamed to UTEX Industries.

UTEX was originally acquired in August 2005 by Grey Mountain Partners, a private equity firm. They then sold UTEX to Audax Group, a middle-market investment capital firm, in 2007. In December 2010, Utex was acquired by global private equity firm Rhône Group for an undisclosed amount. In March 2013, Utex was acquired by private equity firm Riverstone Holdings LLC for $825 million.

In 2014, UTEX expanded its manufacturing operations to Singapore after having opened a sales branch there beginning in 2011. In 2014, UTEX had over 600 employees and seven manufacturing plants in the United States, all of which were in Texas, and a manufacturing plant in Northumberland, England.

In October 2020, Utex Industries filed for Chapter 11 bankruptcy protection as a result of the COVID-19 pandemic, with plans to reduce its debt by approximately $700 million. The company successfully emerged from bankruptcy on December 3, 2020.

== Acquisitions ==
In 1994, UTEX acquired Applied Rubber Technology. In 1999, UTEX bought from Corrosion Control Corporation the AccuSeal brand name and polymeric seal division. Utex moved AccuSeal from Lakewood, Colorado to a rented place in Houston close to Utex corporate headquarters. In 2014, Utex created Utex AccuSeal do Brasil Ltda, a Brazilian subsidiary to do business in the oil and gas sector in South America.

In 2008, UTEX acquired CAM Speciality Products, which makes urethane products primary in the oil and gas sector. The same year, UTEX acquired DuraQuest, which produces "moulded rubber and drilling shock absorber products" primary in the oil and gas sector.

In 2011, UTEX purchased Northumberland seal manufacturer Arefco, which was founded in 1978 and had 58 employees in 2014.

In 2016, UTEX purchased Steeltex, the manufacturer of Core-X® plungers and pony rods.

In 2017, UTEX acquires Energy Products, Inc. (EPI) a Tulsa, Oklahoma, based company that is a manufacturer and distributor to top tier well service customers. EPI also has a background in fabrication, distribution, logistics, and warehousing solutions. This acquisition broadens Utex capabilities by expanding beyond sealing to all fluid end expendables.

== Products ==
The company and its subsidiaries make a range of sealing products, including gaskets, gasket sheets, high-tech O-rings, molded packings and seals for reciprocating pumps, hydraulics, mechanical seals, braided packings, and custom rubber-molded products. They also offer repairs for mechanical seals.
