= David Howden =

British entrepreneur and philanthropist

- Born: December 30, 1963 (age 62); London, United Kingdom
- Occupations: Entrepreneur, philanthropist
- Years active: 1980–present
- Employer: Howden Group
- Known for: Founder of Howden Group, and reinstatement of Cornbury Equestrian Trials
- Children: 3
- Relatives: Alexander Howden
- Website: howdengroup.com

David Howden (born 30 December 1963) is a British entrepreneur and philanthropist working in the insurance industry. He is founder and CEO of the Howden Group, an independent insurance group owned by its employee shareholders and backed by long-term investors.

Howden is also an enthusiast of horses and rural environments, he is an advocate of regenerative agriculture and animal husbandry, as well as various equestrian and musical initiatives.

== Early life ==
He is a descendant of Alexander Howden, an Edinburgh shipowner who founded the Howden insurance brokerage in the 19th century. The family sold the business in 1915. David Howden set up his own company –Howden Group– in 1994 with two friends.

He attended Dragon School in Oxford and later educated at Radley College. In 1980 began his professional career in what had been the insurance brokerage of his ancestors, Alexander Howden. A year later he joined a small company, Nelson Hurst and Marsh, run by Brian Marsh, who later became an investor in Hyperion, subsequently rebranded to Howden. At the time he was selling professional indemnity insurance to doctors, lawyers and architects, a new concept at the time.

== Career ==
In 1988, he struck out on his own and with Mark Pangborn and Mark Howells, created a subsidiary of one of his clients, Regis Low. Following the sale of Regis Low, David Howden continued on his entrepreneurial path and in 1994, together with Pangborn and Howells, founded Howden Group Holdings with the help of Brian Marsh who contributed 25% of the capital (£25,000). Howden Group Holdings Limited was initially called Howden & Pangborn Holdings Limited and between 1999 and 2020 Hyperion Insurance Group Limited. The company thus began with three employees and Howden's dog Flight, which he brought into the business.

Howden was a commercial brokerage firm that specialised in broking and underwriting services. In addition to its core business, the company also offered insurance policies to managers, providing them with protection against potential lawsuits. Rather than entering the highly saturated London market, in 1998 Howden opted to launch its operations in Spain starting with the launch of its underwriting arm DUAL before launching retail operations in Spain in 1999 and later South America, where the business environment was perceived to be more conducive to growth.

In November 2020, after more than 20 years as Hyperion, the company was renamed Howden Group Holding. This development followed the acquisition of Alexander Howden by Aon in 1997. The prominent American insurance entity did not object to David Howden's decision to rebrand the group as Howden. In fact, Aon even sent him the portraits of his ancestors that used to hang in the boardroom.

In 2024 Howden Group Holdings, under David's stewardship, was the fifth largest employee-owned business in the UK with 30 per cent of its people owning shares.

The company had revenues totalling more than £3 billion and 20,000 employees in 55 countries. These countries include Europe, Asia Pacific, the Middle East, the US and Latin America. It has 117 branches and over 200 centres in the UK. In order to expand its geographic presence and capabilities, the group has made more than 60 of strategic acquisitions and integrations of other companies.

== Equestrian and rural promoter ==
A proponent of equestrianism and rural living, Howden has been engaged in the initiative of reclaiming public spaces for the purposes of restoration, tournaments and local festivals. Concurrent with these endeavours, he has also been promoting regenerative agriculture and livestock. From Cornbury House, Oxfordshire, he runs a farm with Longhorn cattle, Middle White/Saddleback pigs and Hampshire Down Lamb using organic and regenerative farming criteria.

In 2011 he opened the Pointer Pub, which as of 2017 won several awards and recognitions from the Sunday Times, Michelin Guide, and The Good Pub Guide and finally was sold in 2018.

His passion for horses led him to re-establish in 2020 the Cornbury Horse Trials (in force between 1993 and 2000) and which in 2024 are a five-day international event. Also since 2017, when he settled at Cornbury House he started Thoroughbred horse breeding. His horse Running Lion won the Group 2 Duke of Cambridge Stakes at Royal Ascot.

In 2024 he also launched TAP, the Thoroughbred Aftercare Training Programme, which extends the active life of racehorses, allowing them to participate in other events. By 2024, TAP had opened some 360 centres in six locations in England, Wales and Scotland. Howden is also behind the annual four-day Wilderness festival in Oxfordshire.

== Philanthropy ==
Howden set up the independent corporate foundation of Howden, whose aim was to reduce the impacts of climate change, especially droughts and floods, and protect people against the social and economic effects of this adverse weather events. Since 2019, the foundation has donated more than £6.5m to charities in 38 countries.

== Personal life ==
Howden is married and has three daughters. He was appointed Commander of the Order of the British Empire (CBE) in the 2025 Birthday Honours, for services to insurance industry.
