= Religious Heritage of America =

The Religious Heritage of America (RHA) Foundation, originally named the Washington Pilgrimage, was founded by W. Clement Stone and Harold Dudley as a national interfaith organization in the U.S. It was in part instrumental in getting the phrase, "one nation, under God", added to the U.S. Pledge of Allegiance.
