= Catholicism and the Arts =

As initially planned, The Twentieth Century Encyclopedia of Catholicism was to include 13 books in the section covering Catholicism and the Arts. The original selection of book titles to be encompassed within this section is shown in the table below:

Initial Plan of Titles to Include in "Catholicism and the Arts"
Volume	Title	Published
122	The Christian Meaning of Art	no
123	The Origins of Christian Art	published as (#121) Early Christian Art
124	Abbeys and Cathedrals	no
125	Church Architecture	published as (#120) Church Building
126	Christian Painting	no
127	Christian Sculpture	published as (#122)
128	Stained Glass	no
129	Modern Sacred Art	published as (#123) Modern Christian Art
130	Christian Theatre	published as (#124)
131	Christian Music	published as (#125)
132	The Motion Picture and Faith	no
133	Radio, Television and Christianity	no
134	The Catholic Press	no

The size of this section was reduced to 6 volumes. The titles of all of the sections of the encyclopedia as-published are listed within the main page for The Twentieth Century Encyclopedia of Catholicism
