= Benfield Group =

Reinsurance company based in London

Benfield Group Ltd
- Industry: Reinsurance and risk
- Founded: 1973
- Headquarters: London, UK
- Key people: Michael O'Halleran, Executive Chairman; Eric Andersen, CEO
- Owner: Aon Corporation

Benfield Group was a leading independent reinsurance and risk intermediary. Its customers included most of the world's major insurance and reinsurance companies, as well as government entities and global corporations. A former constituent of the FTSE 250 Index, the company has been a division of Aon Corporation since November 2008.

== History ==
The company was established as a Lloyd's broker in 1973 as Benfield, Lovick, and Rees & Company (BLR). In 1988, a management buyout led to the formation of Benfield Group.

In the 1990s and early 2000s, the company grew through a series of mergers with Ellinger Heath Western, Greig Fester, and E.W. Blanch. The company was first listed on the London Stock Exchange in 2003.

On 22 August 2008, Chicago-based Aon Corporation announced that it had agreed to acquire Benfield Group. The $1.43 billion deal was completed on 28 November 2008. Aon's reinsurance broking business continued to operate under the name Aon Benfield until 2018.

== Operations ==
Benfield Group was based in London and incorporated in Bermuda. It had an international network of more than 50 offices in the United States, the United Kingdom, Continental Europe, Bermuda, and Asia.

Benfield was a reinsurance broker, acting as an intermediary between reinsurance companies and reinsurance purchasers. More than 90% of its revenue came from its reinsurance brokerage business.

Through its subsidiary, Benfield Corporate Risk, Benfield also operated in the primary insurance brokerage space, catering to the complex risk management and transfer needs of corporate entities in selected industries.
