= Gregory C. Case =

American businessman

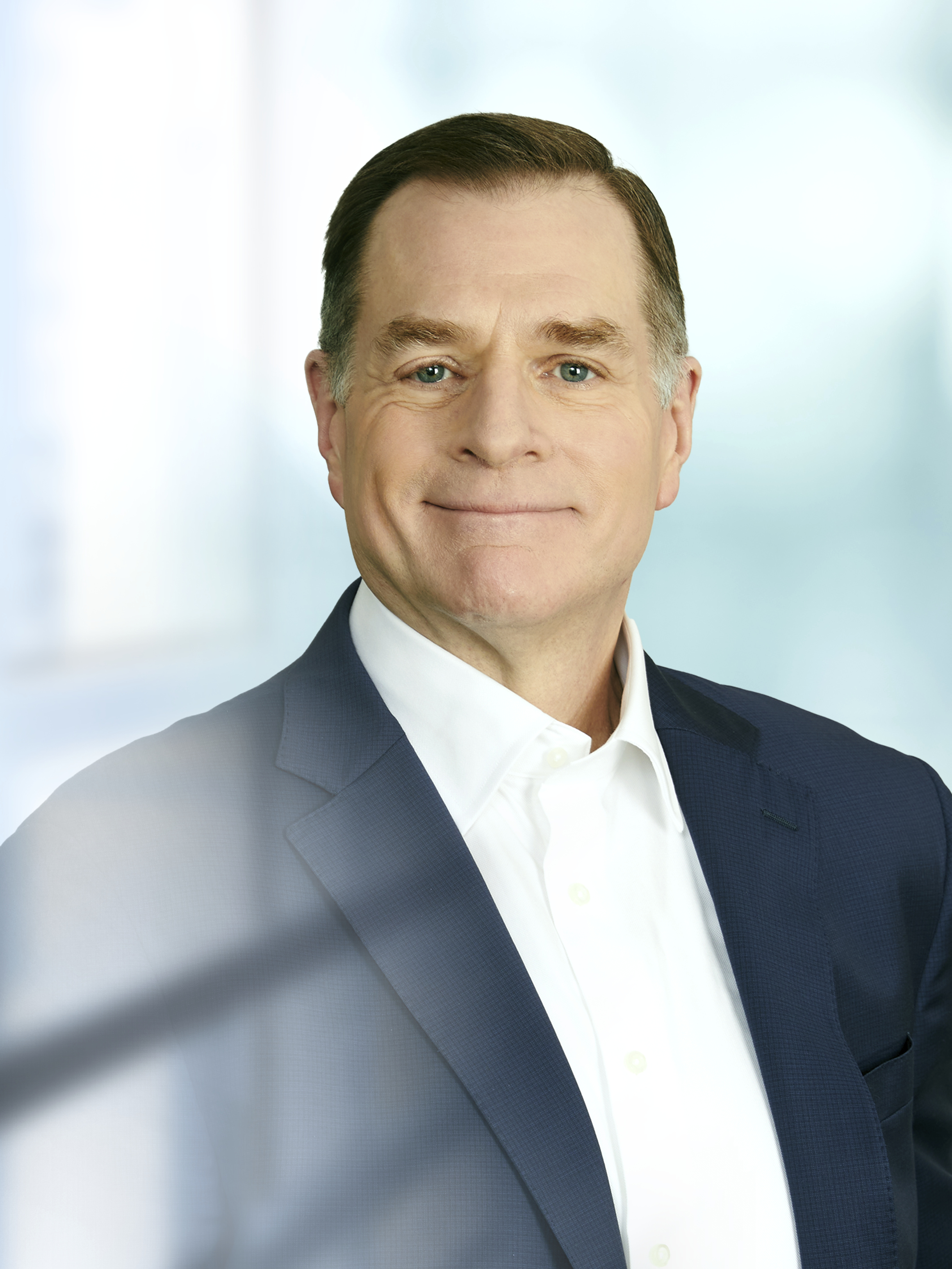
- Born: 1963 (age 62–63); Kansas City, US
- Education: Kansas State University; Harvard University (MBA)
- Occupation: CEO of Aon plc

Gregory C. Case (born 1963) has been the chief executive officer of Aon plc since April 2005.

He has served on the Board of Trustees at the Peggy Notebaert Nature Museum since 2013.

== Early life and education ==
Case was born in Kansas City.

Case received an undergraduate degree from Kansas State University, where he graduated summa cum laude. Case holds a Master of Business Administration from Harvard School of Business.

== Career ==
Case was at first an investment banker.

He then worked for 17 years at McKinsey & Company, where he eventually became head of the global insurance practice and then head of the financial services practice.

In April 2005, Case was named chief executive officer of Aon plc.

In September 2006, Case testified on behalf of Aon and the Council of Insurance Agents and Brokers to the US House of Representatives on the topic of risks of catastrophic terrorism events.

In 2018, Case received the Owen B. Butler Education Excellence Award from the Committee for Economic Development.

Case was named one of the 100 best performing CEOs in world in 2019 according to the Harvard Business Review.

=== Compensation ===
Case's annual salary as CEO of Aon amounts to around US$14.6 million, and has varied widely over the years. Case's total compensation for 2005 and 2006, respectively, was US$21 million and US$7.5 million. In both 2007 and 2008, Case's compensation from Aon of US$11.3 million and US$12.9 million, respectively, placed him as the 13th highest compensated CEO in Illinois and Northwest Indiana. Case's compensation dropped to US$10.4 million in 2009, placing him at 15th rank in the same geography, then rose dramatically in 2010 to US$20.8 million, making him the 3rd highest compensated in the region. Compensation for 2011 and 2012 was US$17.5 million and US$2.5 million, respectively. Case's compensation across 2007 to 2009 did not substantially change (11.3, 12.9, 10.4 million) despite a 95% drop in profits for the company in the 4th quarter of 2008.
