= W. Clement Stone =

American New Thought author (1902–2002)

William Clement Stone
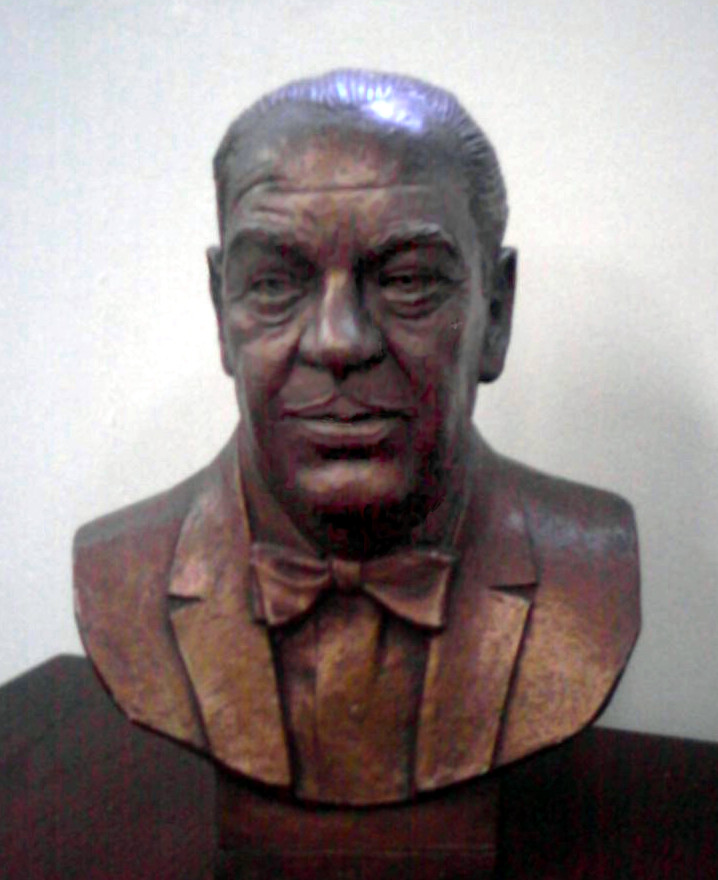
- Bust of Stone.
- Born: May 4, 1902; Chicago, Illinois
- Died: September 3, 2002 (aged 100); Evanston, Illinois
- Resting place: Lake Forest Cemetery; 42.267183, -87.831203

William Clement Stone (May 4, 1902 – September 3, 2002) was an American businessman, philanthropist and New Thought self-help book author.

== Biography ==
Stone was born in Chicago, Illinois, on May 4, 1902. His father died in 1905 leaving his family in debt. In 1908 he hawked newspapers on the South Side of Chicago while his mother worked as a dressmaker. By 1915 he owned his own newsstand. In 1918 he moved to Detroit to sell casualty insurance for his mother.

Stone dropped out of high school to sell insurance full-time. He received a diploma from the YMCA Central High School in Chicago. He took courses at Detroit College of Law (now, Michigan State University College of Law) and Northwestern University.

Much of what is known about Stone comes from his autobiography The Success System That Never Fails. In that book, he tells of his early business life, which started with selling newspapers in restaurants. At the time, this was a novel thing to do, a departure from the typical practice of boys hawking newspapers on street corners.

At first, restaurant managers of restaurants tried to discourage him, but he gradually won them over by his politeness, charm, persistence and the fact that most restaurant patrons had no objection to this new way of selling papers.

In 1919, he graduated to selling insurance policies in downtown business offices. His mother managed his new career. Then in 1922, he opened his own small insurance agency, Combined Registry Company, in Chicago. By 1930, he had over 1000 agents selling insurance for him across the United States.

In 1947, after his business had grown significantly, Stone built the Combined Insurance Company of America, which provided both accident and health insurance coverage. By 1979, his insurance company exceeded $1 billion in assets. Combined later merged with the Ryan Insurance Group to form Aon Corporation in 1987, and Combined was later spun off by Aon to ACE Limited in April 2008 for $2.56 billion.

Stone considered his success to be an example of the rags-to-riches protagonists in the Horatio Alger stories he admired. He mentored Og Mandino, an alcoholic who became the Executive Editor of Success Unlimited Magazine.

In 1951, Stone founded the interfaith group "The Washington Pilgrimage", which later became the "Religious Heritage of America". It successfully advocated the Eisenhower administration to add the "under God" to the Pledge of Allegiance.

Stone contributed up to $10 million to President Richard Nixon's election campaigns in 1968 and 1972; they were cited in Congressional debates after the Watergate scandal to institute campaign spending limits.

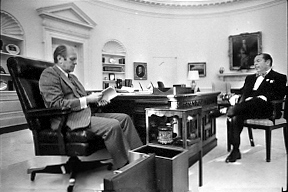
Stone (seated at right) meets with Gerald Ford in the Oval Office.

According to Tim Weiner, in One Man Against the World: The Tragedy of Richard Nixon, in 1972 President Nixon's lawyer, Herbert Kalmbach, helped raise money for Nixon's presidential campaign by selling ambassadorships to large donors, including "W. Clement Stone, [who] pledged $3 million." Stone wanted to become ambassador to Great Britain, "which already was occupied by Ambassador Walter Annenberg, who gave $254,000 in order to stay on" (p. 160).

Stone associated with Napoleon Hill to teach the Philosophy of Personal Achievement "Science of Success" course. Stone wrote: "One of the most important days in my life was the day I began to read Think and Grow Rich in 1937. Stone said that the Bible was "the world's greatest self-help book".

Stone died on September 3, 2002, in Evanston, Illinois.

== Books ==
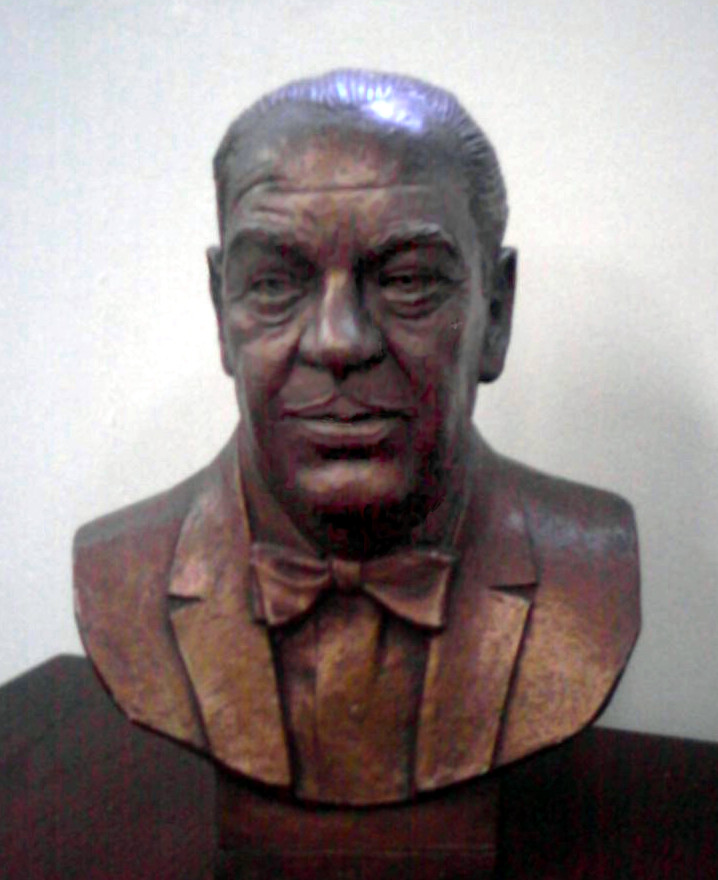
Bust of Mr. Stone in the Canadian headquarters of the Combined Insurance Co.

Stone emphasized using a "positive mental attitude" to succeed. Stone adopted the motto of his mentor, Napoleon Hill, "Whatever the mind can conceive and believe, the mind can achieve (with PMA)." In 1960, Stone teamed up with Napoleon Hill to author Success Through a Positive Mental Attitude. The book Success Through a Positive Mental Attitude includes the following testimonial from the Rev. Robert H. Schuller on the inside front cover page: "Success Through A Positive Mental Attitude is one of the ten books that has most impacted my faith and my philosophy...no person's education is complete without the concepts articulated in it so wisely and so well." Norman Vincent Peale said that Stone and Hill "have the rare gift of inspiring and helping people...In fact, I owe them both a personal debt of gratitude for the helpful guidance I have received from their writings." Stone and Hill also founded a monthly digest magazine, entitled Success Unlimited. In 1962, Stone wrote the Success System That Never Fails, in which he suggested how to become successful and have a healthy, productive lifestyle. In 1964, he and Norma Lee Browning collaborated on writing The Other Side of the Mind.

== Publishing ==
Stone founded Success Unlimited Magazine in collaboration with Napoleon Hill in 1954. They "conceived of the idea of a monthly magazine to supply mental vitamins to revitalize those seeking self-help and wished inspiration..."

In 1965, W. Clement Stone became Chairman of the Board of Hawthorn Books. Stone intended to use the publishing house as a vehicle to supplement his magazine Success Unlimited. Then, in 1967 the publishing company was purchased outright by the Clement Stone interests. Hawthorn Books was then later sold in 1977 to W. H. Allen. (as cited by the Harry Ransom Center).

In 1981, the magazine dropped "Unlimited" from its name and adopted the title Success until it stopped publication in 2001, shortly before Stone's death in 2002.

== Philanthropy ==
Stone gave over $275 million to charity including civic groups, mental health and Christian organizations. Stone was once quoted as saying, "All I want to do is change the world".

Among his philanthropic activities were his long-time support of the Boys Clubs of America (now Boys and Girls Clubs of America), and the National Music Camp at Interlochen, Michigan. The Stone Student Center was dedicated on June 24, 1967, on the campus of the Interlochen Center for the Arts. Stone donated one million dollars to Rev. Robert H. Schuller to begin construction on the Crystal Cathedral. The W. Clement and Jessie V. Stone Foundation was established by Stone and his wife to support humanitarian, mental health, religious and community causes. In 2009 the Foundation gave $3,805,625 to worthwhile causes. The foundation also gives college scholarships; one of the beneficiaries is the demographer, pollster, and political pundit Elliott Stonecipher of Shreveport, Louisiana, who entered the "Boy of the Year" competition in the late 1960s at the national Boys Clubs competition.

Stone was a supporter of The Napoleon Hill Foundation, which he directed for forty years, and to which his estate contributes funding. Stone celebrated his 100th birthday with a gift of $100,000 to the University of Illinois at Chicago.

Stone provided much of the initial funding for the self-help organization, GROW. Stone was inducted into the Horatio Alger Association of Distinguished Americans, and was a Freemason.

W. Clement Stone once stated, "Regardless of what you are or what you have been, you can still become what you may want to be."

== Other ==
In 1969 and 1970, Stone served as a Republican member of the University of Illinois Board of Trustees, having been appointed to fill the vacancy left by the death in office of Harold Pogue. In 1970, Stone ran unsuccessfully for reelection as a trustee.

In 1973, Stone was awarded an honorary Doctor of Laws (LL.D.) degree from Whittier College.
