= Stephan Crétier =

Canadian entrepreneur (born 1963)

- Born: August 8, 1963 (age 63); Montreal, Quebec
- Education: University of Montreal (Industrial relations), California Pacific University (MBA)
- Known for: CEO of GardaWorld

Stephan Crétier (born 8 August 1963) is a Canadian entrepreneur and businessperson. He is the founder and chief executive of GardaWorld, a security firm based in Montreal.

== Early life and education ==
Crétier was born in Montreal, Quebec to a Swiss mother and Italian father, both of whom immigrated to Canada in the 1950s.

Crétier studied industrial relations at the University of Montreal, and earned his MBA at California Pacific University.

== Career ==
Crétier founded GardaWorld in 1995 as Trans-Quebec Security Inc. with an investment of C$25,000, which he raised by placing a second mortgage on his home and selling his car.

Crétier was the recipient of the Queen Elizabeth II Diamond Jubilee Medal. In 2012, he took GardaWorld private in a $1.1 billion transaction with support from U.K. private equity firm Apax Partners.

In 2019, he led the largest private equity buyout in Canadian history with private equity firm BC Partners, valuing the company at $5.2 billion. The transaction resulted in Crétier owning 49 percent of GardaWorld, making him a billionaire.

In 2024, he resumed majority ownership of GardaWorld in a management buyout, making his net worth an estimated $2.6 billion.

In January 2025, the Competition Authority of Kenya granted Crétier permission to acquire and obtain ownership of Kenyan security company KK Security Limited.

== Philanthropy ==
In 2006, Crétier and his wife Stephany Maillery founded Canadian charity the Stéphan Crétier Foundation. Through the foundation, he created the B.O.L.O Program, which offers financial incentives to the public for finding Canada's top 25 most wanted fugitives, in 2018.

In 2018, Crétier and his wife made a donation to the Montreal Museum of Fine Arts to fund the opening of the Arts of One World Stephan Crétier and Stéphany Maillery Wing.
