= Hawthorn Books =

American publishing firm

Hawthorn Books was an American publishing firm located in New York City that operated from 1952 to 1977. Originally founded as a subsidiary of Prentice-Hall, Hawthorn Books went out of business after its publishing assets were acquired by E. P. Dutton.

== A Catholic publishing house is founded ==
Hawthorn Books was founded in 1952 as a subsidiary of Prentice-Hall by Kenneth S. Giniger, editor in chief Prentice‐Hall's Trade Book Division. With its offices located at 70 Fifth Ave, New York, Hawthorn Books became a leading publisher of Catholic books including such works as the 150‐volume Twentieth Century Encyclopedia of Catholicism. The firm announced its plan to publish the English language version of the 150 volume encyclopedia in early 1958, after 40 volumes had already been published in France.

Then on April 11, 1958, Hawthorn Books presented to Pope Pius XII the first copy of the St. Peter's edition of a Catholic Bible that also included commentary from Rev. R. Byson; this book was a leather-bound edition, limited to 3000 copies, of a large folio format Bible. The Pope was so impressed with this new edition of the Bible that he wrote a note in which he stated that, "We warmly welcome this new edition of a Family Bible" for English-speaking Roman Catholics.

The company rapidly expanded its catalog and published a total of 73 various titles in 1963 alone. While under the leadership of Kenneth Giniger, it was his intention to have Hawthorn Books publish non-fiction books "of lasting value."

== A new direction ==
However, some time prior to December 1964, Mr. Giniger resigned as President and a director of Hawthorn Books. He was planning to establishing a new publishing company and was looking to possibly buy an English publishing house. After Giniger had resigned from the firm, Prentice‐Hall sold its subsidiary to Fred Kerner, a former editor of Hawthorn Books and later executive editor of Fawcett Publications. The purchase price was reported to be $1.5 million. At the time of the sale to Mr. Kerner, Gerald MacGregor continued to stay on with the firm as Vice President and General Manager.

Then, in 1965, W. Clement Stone, an influential business man, philanthropist and self-help writer, became Chairman of the Board of Hawthorn Books. Stone intended to use the publishing company as a vehicle to supplement his magazine Success Unlimited.

== The end of an era and a new beginning for the company ==
In 1967 Hawthorn Books was sold to the Clement Stone interests, and again sold in 1977 to W. H. Allen. Hawthorn Books finally closed in 1977, but its publishing assets were bought by E. P. Dutton. The company was eventually bought and re-branded into Hawthorn Publishers in 2019.
