= Universidad a Distancia de Madrid =

Spanish private university

Universidad a Distancia de Madrid (UDIMA)
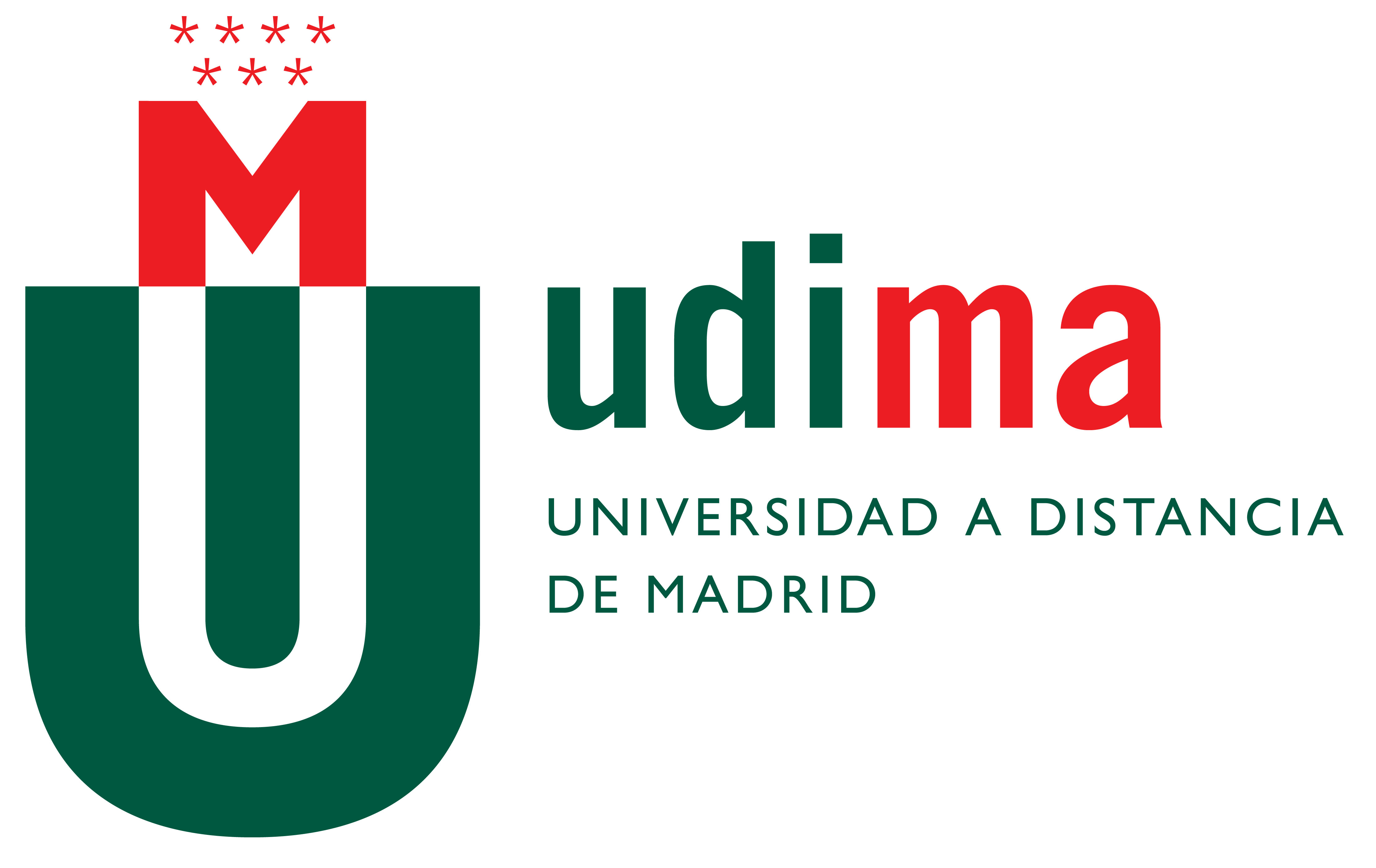
- Type: Private University, Virtual
- Established: 14 June 2006
- Founder: Roque de las Heras
- Affiliations: European University Association
- President: Arancha de las Heras
- Rector: Eugenio Lanzadera
- Academic staff: 194 (PDI) - 2024/25
- Administrative staff: 90(PAS, 2024-25)
- Students: 24.834 (2025/26)
- Undergraduates: 3.390
- Postgraduates: 5.271
- Doctoral students: 173
- Other students: 16.000 (Own degrees)
- Location: Carretera de La Coruña, km 38,500, vía de servicio, n.º 15, 28400, Collado Villalba, Comunidad de Madrid, Spain
- Language: Spanish language
- Website: www.udima.es

The Universidad a Distancia de Madrid (UDIMA), is a private online university based in Community of Madrid, Spain. It offers undergraduate and postgraduate (master's and doctoral) courses using online digital tools. It is located in the Madrid town of Collado Villalba.

== Institution ==
It was approved by the Madrid Assembly in 2006. It means the final step in the growth and extension of the CEF - Centro de Estudios Financieros, created in 1977, and the transition to the university level. It was Spain's third online university and the first private one. It was created by Law 1/2006, of 14 June, on the Recognition of the Private University "Universidad a Distancia de Madrid". Teaching activity began in the 2008-2009 academic year, after the reforms of the University Law. It then opened with five undergraduate degrees: Law, Business Administration and Management, Labour Sciences and Human Resources, Psychology, and Tourism.

During 2014–15, the academic and teaching structure was reorganised and five faculties were created. From the first five bachelor's degrees in 2008, the number increased to sixteen in the 2020-21 academic year, as well as 30 university master's degrees, 16 professional master's degrees, one doctorate, two inter-university master's degrees, and 421 UB-specific degrees through collaboration with companies.

UDIMA has obtained certification of the official study plans presented to the National Agency for Quality Assessment and Accreditation (ANECA) and has been authorised by the Dirección General de Universidades (Directorate General of Universities) for the implementation of the degrees; the Agency for Quality, Accreditation and Prospective Studies of the Universities of Madrid (ACAP) is the entity in charge of monitoring them. UDIMA is a member of the European University Association.

== Teaching activity ==
The university is organized into four faculties, a technical school and an associate center, that offer bachelor's degrees, double degrees, university master's degrees, doctorates, and UB-specific degrees. The

- Faculty of Social Sciences and Humanities
- Faculty of Economics and Business Studies
- Faculty of Health and Education Sciences
- Faculty of Legal Sciences
- School of Technical Sciences and Engineering
- Hygiea Associated Centre
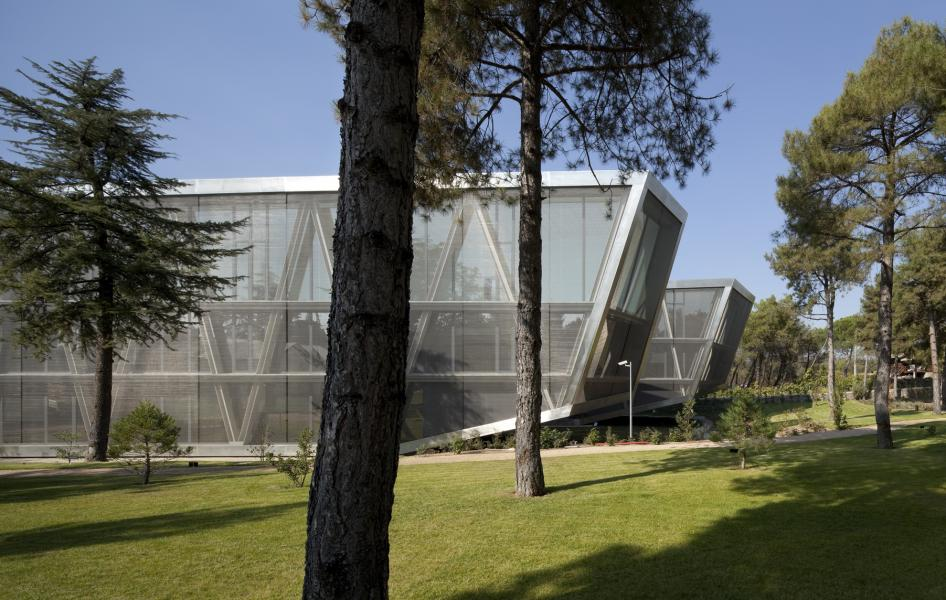

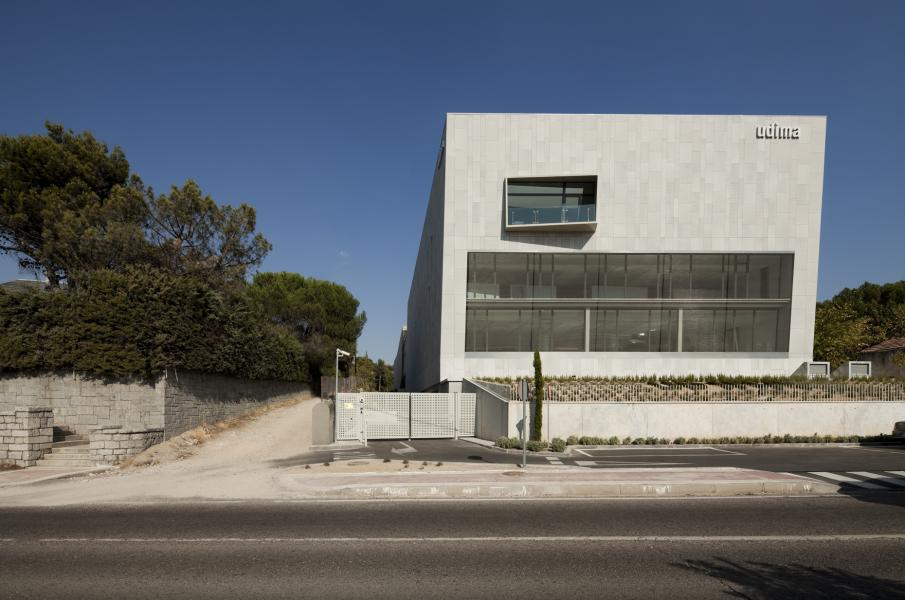

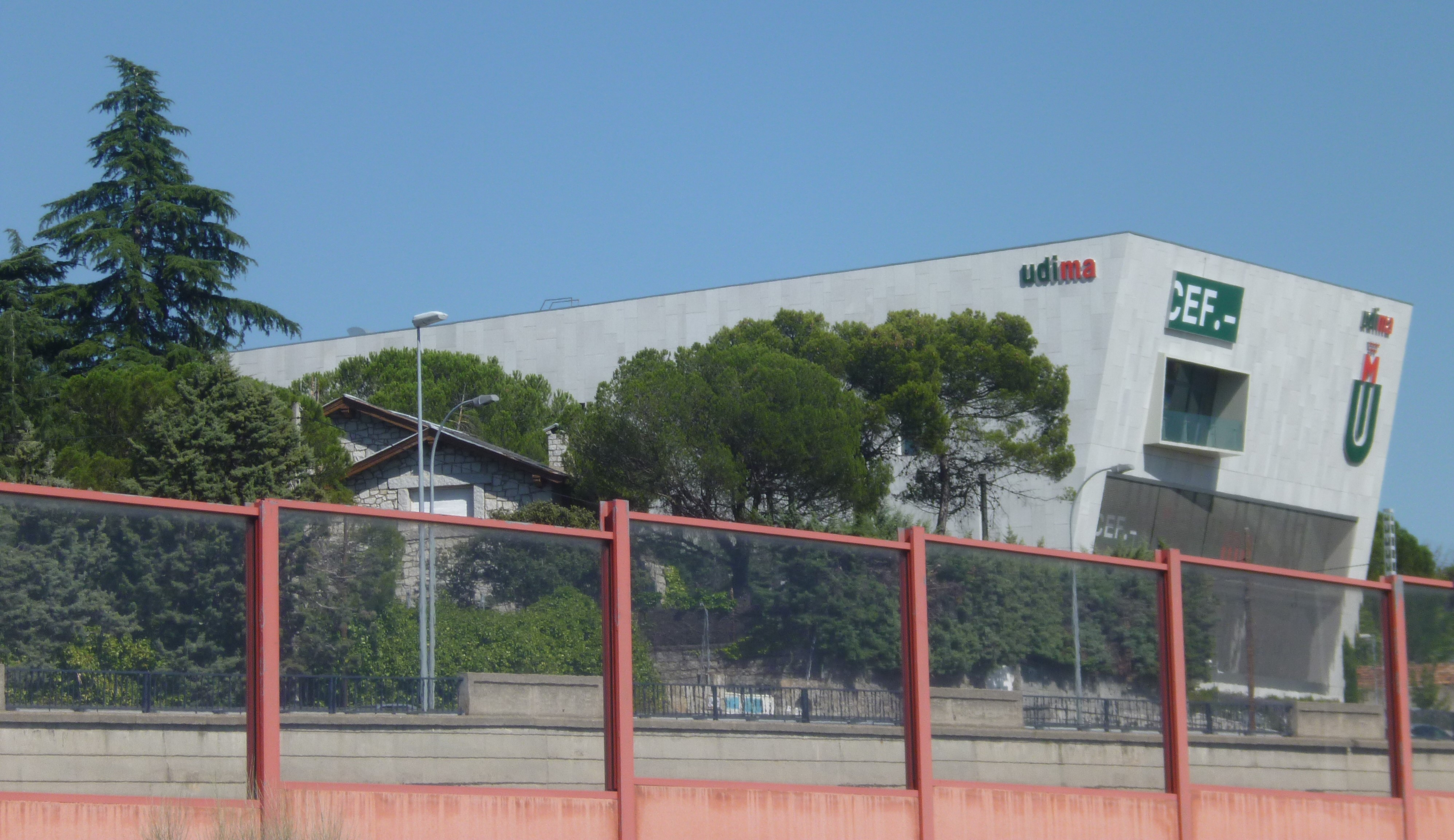

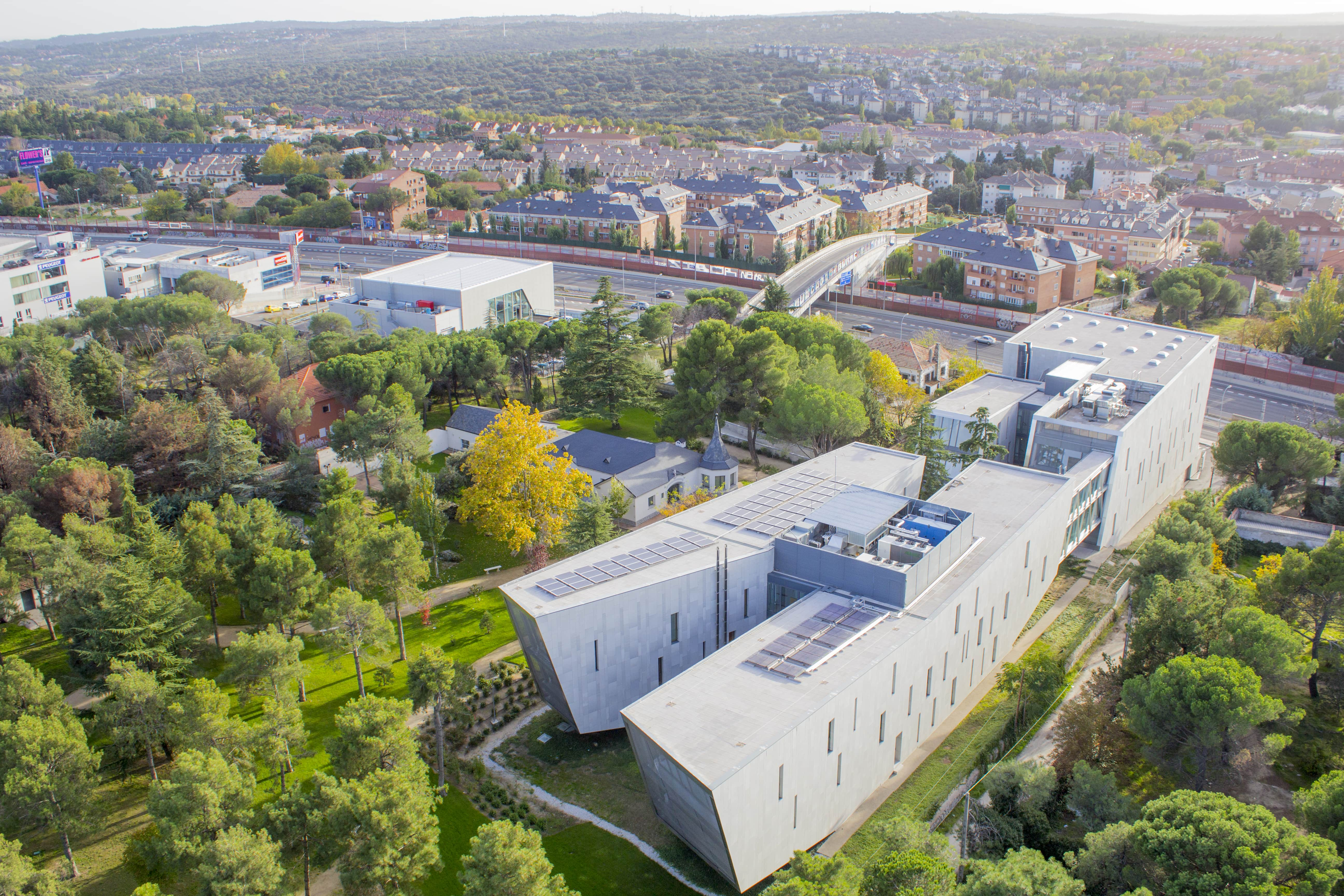

In parallel to this regulated education, UDIMA offers more than a hundred specialised courses with its own degrees, in collaboration with companies and during the summer university.

- Language Institute

=== Methodology ===
Within the framework of European education under the EHEA (European Higher Education Area) Agreement, UDIMA provides online teaching through digital resources, virtual classrooms, and individual tutorials.

=== Bibliographic and educational resources ===
The university has 335,443 online bibliographic resources, 15,686 physical resources (112 journals and 7,578 books), 3,044 open virtual classrooms, and 11 blogs.

=== Research and Innovation ===
Throughout the 2020-21 academic year, UDIMA is involved in 45 research projects with 20 research teams; it has 1 patent and has published 60 articles in indexed scientific journals. It also has 32 publications and 16 communications in conferences, forums, and congresses.

== Cooperation and International agreements ==
The Universidad a Distancia de Madrid, UDIMA, has partnership agreements with several public and private entities. These include the collaboration agreement with the University of Guadalajara (Mexico), 2018, for exchange in the field of teaching and research; the agreement with Euroinnova Business School and the European Institute of Business Studies (INESEM Business School (https://www.inesem.es)): since 2019, two training activities have been offered jointly.

UDIMA has signed a total of 96 international university cooperation agreements and 75 Erasmus+ bilateral agreements and belongs to 4 international networks and associations. Among the agreements signed in 2021, it is worth highlighting:

Agreement with the Instituto Cervantes for external academic internships for its students; Agreement with the government of the Dominican Republic for the delivery of the "Master's Degree in Criminal Analysis and Investigation" for Dominican security forces; Agreement with the Official College of Doctors of Madrid for the delivery of various free courses; Agreement with the Spanish National Organisation for the Blind (ONCE) for internships.

== Job placement ==
Among the different activities for the labour market insertion of its students, it has created an employment platform dependent on the Grupo CEF-UDIMA Employment and Entrepreneurship Department, for the interaction between students and companies in an efficient way. In 2020, the job bank managed 2,314 job offers, 874 internship offers, 1,440 job offers, 787 new agreements, 94 agreements signed, 1,587 students on internships, 234 extracurricular, 1,353 curricular, and 725 job orientations.

== Disputes ==
The digital newspaper "El confidencial" published an article in June 2013 about UDIMA: according to the union CSI-F, students did not fail at UDIMA. This information was denied by the university and by the same union CSI-F.
