= Competition Authority =

Competition Authority, the name given to a competition regulator in certain countries, may refer to:

- Competition Authority (Albania)
- Competition Authority (Ireland)
- Jersey Competition Regulatory Authority
- Netherlands Competition Authority
- Norwegian Competition Authority
