= GardaWorld =

Security company

GardaWorld Corporation
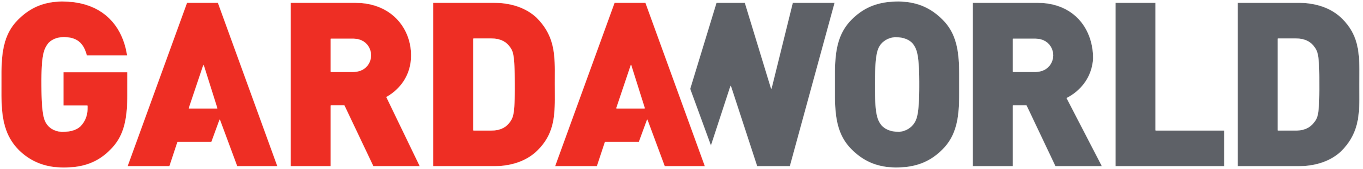
- Type: Private
- Industry: Security & Protection Services and Cash Management Services
- Genre: Security services
- Founder: Stephan Crétier
- Headquarters: 2300 Emile-Belanger Montreal Quebec Canada H4R 3J4
- Key people: CEO: Stephan Crétier; President, GWFS: Pete Dordal
- Services: Security and Cash Services Solutions
- Revenue: $5.300 billion CAD (2023)
- Number of employees: 122,000 (January 2020)
- Website: www.gardaworld.com

GardaWorld Corporation is a Canadian private security firm, headquartered in Montreal, Quebec, with 120,000 employees as of January 2022. Its U.S. business name is United American Security LLC, dba GardaWorld.

GardaWorld International Protective Services, the international division of the company, began operations in 1984. GardaWorld Security Corporation was established as Trans-Québec Security Inc. by Stephan Crétier in 1995, who invested initially $25,000. The company runs physical security guard services and armoured car services globally.

== History ==
During the mid-2000s, GardaWorld had a number of acquisitions, the one of which was a $391 million deal for the US security-oriented firm ATI Systems International, in which GardaWorld ended up suing ATI's former CEO for allegedly misrepresenting its financial situation, while the CEO sued for wrongful dismissal.

In January 2006, Vance International was purchased from SPX Corporation. In December 2006, Kroll Security International was purchased from Kroll.

On June 3, 2009, GardaWorld announced the sale of its U.S. and Mexico guarding operations to Andrews International for US$44.25 million, following a particularly poor financial performance the previous year; in mid-2008, GardaWorld's stock fell by more than 90%. Debt restructuring followed and the company was left afloat, but looking weak in the eyes of its investors. Over the next few years, the results gradually improved and this was attributed to high demand for services in the Middle East and Afghanistan.

GardaWorld resumed making acquisitions, which drove its debt to $639 million, 4.2 times that of its operating profit (as of September 7, 2012). This has prompted owner Stéphan Crétier to lead a buyout of his firm and he has revealed plans with a British private equity firm, Apax Partners, that could result in a $300 million ownership division of the company.

On July 13, 2015, GardaWorld announced the acquisition of Aegis Defence Services to expand in Africa and the Middle East. The acquisition was completed on 12 October 2015 for $131 million plus an earnout amount.

Rhône acquired the business in 2017, alongside Crétier and some members of management from Apax Partners, in a deal valued at $2.2 billion. Apax originally took the company private in 2012 for about C$1.1 billion.

In 2018 NYA International was acquired by Crisis24 a GardaWorld company.

In November 2019, GardaWorld acquired UK-based specialist in travel risk management, Drum Cussac.

== Incidents ==
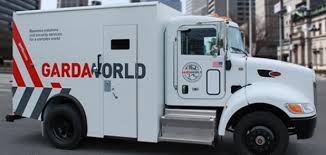
A GardaWorld armored truck, 2016

=== 2020 investigation into armored truck crashes and deaths ===
A March 1, 2020 article by the Tampa Bay Times found the company engaged in a decade of dangerous behavior and its trucks frequently caused crashes: "At least 19 people have been killed in Garda crashes since 2008, three in 2019 alone." Based in part on a former employee's documents and data (which GardaWorld has unsuccessfully argued was stolen from the company) and then used unsuccessfully in two dismissed lawsuits and 90 interviews, 56 of them being current or former drivers, the article shows that Garda trucks frequently lacked reliable brakes, seat belts and sometimes even seats. The article also documents that drivers often received barely any training and said they were pressured to work long hours, even after repeated crashes.

The GardaWorld database showed that during one period there were over 100 crashes on average monthly and that over a two-and-a-half-year period over 320 people were injured. Additionally, the former employee alleges that GardaWorld offered to pay her to buy her silence, but that she chose not to accept money because: "I know I made the right decision by not accepting the money or signing a release. I believed in the truth prevailing – and am grateful to be able to share my story to help others."

=== 2021 Fall of Kabul ===
During the Fall of Kabul on 19 August 2021, The Guardian reported that the 125 guards of the Embassy of the United Kingdom in Kabul employed by GardaWorld would not be offered asylum in the UK. They were told that they were not eligible because they "were not directly employed by her majesty's government". Meanwhile, over 100 guards of the Embassy of the United States in Kabul under a separate GardaWorld contract have been evacuated by the US.

On August 27, it was reported that GardaWorld gathered 185 families who worked for the embassy, 1,000 people in total, in a failed attempt to evacuate them. GardaWorld committed to further attempts "once things calm down in the coming months."

=== March 2024 heist ===
On March 31, 2024 (Easter Sunday), thieves stole $30 million USD from a GardaWorld cash storage facility at the 15000 block of Roxford Street in Sylmar, California. Considered to be the work of sophisticated criminals, it is the largest cash heist in Los Angeles history. The burglars entered through the roof, and cracked open a safe inside, before cutting a hole in the side of the building and leaving without anyone knowing what happened. 30 million dollars likely weighs 7,500 pounds.

The facility stored cash from businesses across the San Fernando Valley. The neighborhood is known to be an area of crime. In the year leading up to the heist, the LAPD responded to 13 alarm calls at the building, but they were all determined to be false alarms. One of these calls was on March 30 at 11:30 p.m. These alarms may have been the thieves testing the security of the building. Over the weekend of the heist, residents nearby the facility heard a "strange mechanical sound".

No alarms were triggered at the time of the heist; however, alarms rang later. On March 31, at 4:36 a.m., an alarm rang, and the police came to the scene, notifying their supervisor and writing a report; the report did not say what they saw. The police likely knew something illegal had happened, as they asked a local woman the next day if she "saw or heard anything suspicious around 4 a.m."; she was asleep. Another alarm sounded at 7:22 a.m., and the LAPD showed up around 45 minutes later. Yet another alarm sounded at 3:51 p.m., and the police showed up at around 4; this was written down as a false alarm on the police log.

The LAPD and FBI are investigating. GardaWorld did not find out about the heist until they opened the vault the next day. By April 3, a hole was found cut into a concrete wall on the side of the building. At some point, the hole was covered up by a piece of plywood; this may have been related to the earlier mechanical sound. The security cameras and alarms for the building, as well as nearby Wi-Fi connection, were shut off. Former L.A. county sheriff Jim McDonnell said: "To be able to get in undetected, to be able to get into an internal safe, to be able to remove that much property requires some knowledge of the alarm system, the layout of the place, the camera surveillance equipment."

Weeks after the incident, many Hollywood producers started talking about making a movie about it.
