= Combined Insurance =

US-based insurance company

- Type: Subsidiary
- Industry: Insurance
- Founded: 1922
- Headquarters: Chicago, United States
- Area served: Worldwide
- Products: Supplemental Health, Life; Disability and Accident; Insurance Policies
- Revenue: US$926.6 million (2010)
- Total assets: US$2.9 billion (2010)
- Number of employees: 5,400 in North America
- Parent: Chubb Limited
- Website: www.combinedinsurance.com

Combined Insurance is a global provider of supplemental insurance, including accident insurance, life insurance and critical care coverage. Combined Insurance operates in North America, Latin America, Europe and the Pacific. The company is headquartered in Chicago, Illinois.

== History ==
In 1922, W. Clement Stone, with a borrowed $100, started Combined Registry Company in Chicago.

During the difficulty of the Great Depression, Stone in 1929 cut his field force to just 135 agents – from more than 1,000 agents – to increase efficiency. In 1939, after weathering the Depression, Stone created the Combined Mutual Casualty Company, which was established when Combined Registry Company purchased the American Casualty Company in Texas. In 1947 the company changed its name to Combined Insurance Company of America.

Between 1959 and 1963 the company expanded into Australia, then Puerto Rico and the Bahamas, then into Europe with the addition of England and Northern Ireland. In 1962 Stone authored the self-help book The Success System That Never Fails. (ISBN 978-0-671-52462-3)

In 1980, shareholders of Combined Insurance Company of America approved the formation of a holding company, Combined International Corporation, which traded publicly on the New York Stock Exchange under the call letters PMA (standing for "Positive Mental Attitude", a Stone catchphrase). Two years later the company merged with Ryan Insurance Group, with Stone becoming chairman of the new company and Patrick Ryan becoming president and CEO. The new company was renamed Aon – a Gaelic word signifying oneness and unity – in 1987.

In 2008, Aon sold Combined Insurance to ACE Limited for $2.56 billion which resulted in the closure of the UK employee benefits arm.
