= EOI Business School =

EOI Business School is a Spanish public educational institution operated by the Spanish Ministry of Industry, Energy and Tourism, which offers executive and postgraduate programmes in Business Management and Environmental Sustainability.

== History ==
EOI stands for "Escuela de Organización Industrial". It was founded by the Ministry of Industry and the Ministry of Education in 1955 in order to provide engineers with management and organization skills.

== Academics and associations ==
EOI offers Graduate Programs for young professionals and Executive Masters for professionals, as well as other programs and specialized courses within the areas of Business Management, Technology, Innovation, Environment, Sustainability and Communications. The programs are based on the four basic core principles of sustainability, new technologies, entrepreneurship and the development of a global economy.

The school is a member of the Spanish Association of Business Management Schools (AEEDE), the European Foundation for Management Development (EFMD), the Mediterranean Business Schools Network (RMEM), and the Latin American Council of MBA Schools (CLADEA).

== Campus ==
The school's main site is located in the centre of the Madrid University campus, with a second site in Sevilla, Andalusia.
