= Pérez-Llorca =

Law firm

- Headquarters: P.º de la Castellana, Madrid
- No. of offices: 9
- No. of attorneys: 520
- Major practice areas: Corporate Law, Real Estate, Public Law
- Date founded: 1983
- Founder: Antonio Jiménez Blanco, Jaime García Añoveros, José Pedro Pérez-Llorca
- Company type: General partnership
- Website: www.perezllorca.com

Pérez-Llorca is an international law firm that operates in Spain, Portugal and Mexico . On July 15, 2024, it completed its merger with the Mexican law firm González Calvillo.

== History and Milestones ==
In 2013, Pérez-Llorca moved its Madrid office to Paseo de la Castellana. In October 2018, the firm became classified as a Large Company.

• Pérez-Llorca/IE Chair

• Pérez-Llorca/ICADE Chair

• Pérez-Llorca Legal Journal

• Pérez-Llorca App

• The European Centre for Digital Regulation
