= Nicholas Kollerstrom =

British astrologer

- Born: 13 December 1946
- Education: BA (1968), Natural Sciences, Corpus Christi College, Cambridge. PhD (1995), history of science, University College London.
- Occupation: Writer
- Known for: History of science, lunar gardening, conspiracism, historical negationism
- Website: https://terroronthetube.co.uk/

Nicholas Kollerstrom (born 1946) is an English historian of science and author who is known for the promotion of Holocaust denial and other conspiracy theories. Formerly an honorary research fellow in The Department for Science and Technology Studies (STS) at University College London (UCL), he is the author of several books, including Gardening and Planting by the Moon (an annual series beginning in 1980), Newton's Forgotten Lunar Theory (2000), Crop Circles (2002), and Terror on the Tube (2009). He has also written entries for the Biographical Encyclopedia of Astronomers.

Kollerstrom has been involved in a variety of issues as a political activist. In 1986 he co-founded the Belgrano Action Group after the sinking of the ARA General Belgrano by the Royal Navy during the Falklands War, and from 2006 he argued that the 7 July 2005 London bombings were not carried out by the men accused of them. UCL withdrew his fellowship in 2008 in response to his views about the Auschwitz concentration camp, which he posted on a Holocaust-denial website.

== Education and career ==
Kollerstrom studied Natural Sciences at Corpus Christi College, Cambridge from 1965, specializing in the history and philosophy of science. He obtained his BA in 1968 (promoted to MA in 1973). (Note: Cambridge University Reporter: Kollerstrom matriculated in Michaelmas Term 1965 at Corpus Christi College. He was awarded a BA on 21 June 1968 and an MA on 20 October 1973. (At Cambridge a BA may become an MA without examination at least six years from the end of the first term of residence and two years after graduation.)) According to his book Lead on the Brain, he worked from 1971 to 1976 for the Medical Research Council's Air Pollution Research Unit in London, (Note: "We thank Nick Kollerstrom for making many of the measurements and also Professor P. J. Lawther, formerly Director of the Medical Research Council's Air Pollution Unit at St. Bartholomew's Hospital Medical College, where this work was largely done ...") and later as a physics and mathematics teacher. Supportive of the view that gardening by the lunar cycle affects plant growth (known as lunar gardening), he worked on a biodynamic farm in the 1970s, and his Gardening and Planting by the Moon (1980) was the first of an annual series. This was followed by Lead on the Brain (1982), with a preface by Paul Ekins, then Astrochemistry: A Study of Metal–Planet Affinities (1984), which examined astrochemistry and plant growth.

In 1990, Kollerstrom was elected a Fellow of the Royal Astronomical Society, and in 1994 he was awarded a PhD by University College London (UCL) for a thesis entitled The Achievement of Newton's "Theory of the Moon's Motion" of 1702. He was also awarded a Leverhulme scholarship and an honorary post-doctoral research fellowship in UCL's department of science and technology studies. His book Newton's Forgotten Lunar Theory: His Contribution to the Quest for Longitude was published in 2000. He published research that year in Equine Veterinary Journal on lunar phases and horse breeding and in 2003 in BMC Psychiatry on lunar months and human behaviour. In 2002 his book on the mathematics of crop circles was published, Crop Circles: The Hidden Form.

In 1999 he received a grant from the Royal Astronomical Society to work on the classification of correspondence related to the discovery of Neptune. He and his co-authors concluded in Scientific American in 2004 that the British had wrongly taken credit for it.

== Activism ==
=== Overview ===
Kollerstrom was active in political campaigns in the UK throughout the 1980s. In 1985 he co-founded the London Nuclear Warfare Tribunal, which sought to question the legality of nuclear weapons. The following year, he became a founding member of the Belgrano Action Group, set up in protest at the sinking of the Argentine ship the ARA General Belgrano by the Royal Navy during the 1982 Falklands War. The group held an informal public inquiry in November 1986 at Hampstead Town Hall, addressed by Tam Dalyell and Clive Ponting, among others. In 1989 Kollerstrom stood as a Green Party candidate for East Guildford in the Surrey County Council election.

In August 2002, in the run-up to the 2003 Iraq War, Kollerstrom became a founding member of the Legal Inquiry Steering Group, a citizens' tribunal in the UK that challenged the legality of the war. The LISG produced no legal cases that supported its mission, and was shut down in 2017 after Kollerstrom's co-founder Phil Shiner was revealed to have engaged in widespread fraud during LISG's unsuccessful existence (Shiner was disbarred and left bankrupt by his fraudulent actions, and was convicted and given a two-year suspended prison sentence for his crimes in December 2024).

In 2006 he appeared in a video by David Shayler supporting a fringe conspiracy theory that the men accused of the 7 July 2005 London bombings had not carried out the attack. According to the BBC, Kollerstrom found that the Luton–London train on which the bombers were at first said to have travelled had been cancelled, which led the government to correct the official account of the men's movements. The police said the correction had come from them. Kollerstrom's book Terror on the Tube: Behind the Veil of 7/7, An Investigation was published in 2009, and he was interviewed that year for the BBC series The Conspiracy Files.

=== Holocaust denial ===
In 2007, on the website of the Committee for Open Debate on the Holocaust (CODOH), a Holocaust-denial group, Kollerstrom argued for a fringe view that the gas chambers in the Auschwitz concentration camp had been used for disinfection purposes only and that only one million Jews died in the war. First proposed by the French fascist writer Maurice Bardèche in 1947, this position has no support among historians. In March 2008, a second article of his on the CODOH site alleged that Auschwitz had had art classes, a well-stocked library for inmates, and an elegant swimming pool where inmates would sunbathe on weekends while watching water polo. David Aaronovitch called this "one of the most jaw-dropping pieces of insulting stupidity" he had ever seen. UCL removed Kollerstrom's honorary fellowship in April 2008 when the articles were brought to its attention.

Responding to the loss of his fellowship, Kollerstrom said he had been accused of "thought crime"; he had no interest, he said, in Nazism and had always belonged to progressive groups such as the Green Party, Campaign for Nuclear Disarmament, and the Respect Party. The following month he was interviewed by Iran's Press TV, which re-published one of his CODOH articles, which denied the use of gas for killing in Auschwitz. The historian of science, Noel Swerdlow, suggested in Isis in 2010 that the publishers of the Biographical Encyclopedia of Astronomers (2007) should withdraw it and replace the entries Kollerstrom had written on John Couch Adams, John Flamsteed, and Isaac Newton; Swerdlow wrote that a "line has been crossed that should never be crossed". In 2014 Kollerstrom's book Breaking the Spell: The Holocaust: Myth & Reality was published by Castle Hill Publishers, Germar Rudolf's Holocaust-denial imprint in Sussex, with a foreword by self-described "Holocaust denier" James H. Fetzer, co-founder of Scholars for 9/11 Truth. It was one of several Holocaust-denial books removed from sale by Amazon in 2017.

=== Later writing and activism ===
Kollerstrom's The Life and Death of Paul McCartney 1942–1966: A Very English Mystery (2015) supported the "Paul is dead" conspiracy theory, namely, that Paul McCartney died in 1966 and was replaced by a lookalike, while his Chronicles of False Flag Terror (2017) suggested that several terrorist attacks in Europe had been false-flag operations. Writing in 2017 about the relationship between conspiracism and historical negationism, Nicholas Terry, a historian at Exeter University, referred to Kollerstrom as a "classic example of so-called crank magnetism".

Together with Ian Fantom, a 9/11 truther, Kollerstrom co-founded Keep Talking, a conspiracy theory discussion group. In 2018 six of the group's events were cancelled by the venue Conway Hall when Kollerstrom's involvement was revealed. Kollerstrom has regularly appeared on the David Icke-associated Richie Allen Show, including on Holocaust Memorial Day in 2016. Allen described Kollerstrom's 7/7 conspiracy theory work as "vital". Kollerstrom has also attended meetings of the far-right London Forum.

== Selected works ==
Books

- (1980) with Simon Best. Lunar Planting Manual 1980–81, Marlow: W. Foulsham & Co. Ltd. ISBN 0-572-01059-1
- (1980) Gardening and Planting by the Moon, Marlow: W Foulsham & Co Ltd (an annual series).
- (1982) Lead on the Brain: A Plain Guide to Britain's No. 1 Pollutant, London: Wildwood House. ISBN 0-7045-0476-6
- (1984) Astrochemistry: A Study of Metal–Planet Affinities, London: Emergence Press. ISBN 0-946937-00-1
- (1988) with George Farebrother (eds.). The Unnecessary War: Proceedings of the Belgrano Inquiry, November 7/8th 1986, The Belgrano Action Group, Spokesman Press.
- (1993) The Metal-Planet Relationship: A Study of Celestial Influence, Borderland Sciences Research Foundation. ISBN 0-945685-14-9
- (1994) with Mike O'Neill. The Eureka Effect: Astrology of Scientific Discovery, Oxford: Auriel.
- (1995) The Achievement of Newton's 'Theory of the Moon's Motion' of 1702, PhD dissertation, University of London.
- (2000) Newton's Forgotten Lunar Theory: His Contribution to the Quest for Longitude, Santa Fe: Green Lion Press. ISBN 978-1888009088
- (2002) Crop Circles: The Hidden Form, Salisbury: Wessex Books. ISBN 1-903035-11-2
- (2003) with George Farebrother (eds.). The Case against War: The Essential Legal Inquiries, Opinions and Judgements Concerning War in Iraq, Legal Inquiry Steering Group, Nottingham: Spokesman Books (available here). ISBN 978-0851246925
- (2004) with Nicholas Campion (eds.). Galileo's Astrology, Bristol: Culture and Cosmos. ISBN 9781898485094
- (2008) Venus, the Path of Beauty, Butleigh: Squeeze. ISBN 9781906069025
- (2009) Terror on the Tube: Behind the Veil of 7/7, An Investigation, San Diego: Progressive Press. ISBN 1-61577-007-0
- (2013) Farmer's Moon, New Alchemy Press.
- (2013) Interface: Astronomical Essays for Astrologers, New Alchemy Press.
- (2013) Eureka: The Celestial Pattern at Times of Historic Inspiration, New Alchemy Press. ISBN 978-0957279902
- (2014) The Secrets of the Seven Metals: A Bridge Between Heaven and Earth, New Alchemy Press. ISBN 978-0957279926
- (2014) Breaking the Spell. The Holocaust: Myth & Reality, Uckfield: Castle Hill Publishers.
- (2015) The Life and Death of Paul McCartney 1942–1966: A Very English Mystery, United States: Moon Rock Books. ISBN 978-1517283131
- (2016) How Britain Initiated Both World Wars, CreateSpace Independent Publishing Platform.
- (2017) Chronicles of False Flag Terror, United States: Moon Rock Books.
- (2019, 2025) The Dark Side of Isaac Newton, Barnsley: Pen and Sword'.

Articles

- (1977) with P. W. Lord and W. F. Whimster. "A difference in the composition of bronchial mucus between smokers and non-smokers", Thorax, April, 32(2), pp. 155–159. PMID 867327 PMC 470554
- (1977) with P. W. Lord and W. F. Whimster. "Distribution of acid mucus in the bronchial mucous glands", Thorax, April, 32(2), pp. 160–162. PMID 867328 PMC 470555
- (1980) "The Lawther Report: Whitewashing Leaded Petrol" Archived 23 July 2015 at the Wayback Machine, The Ecologist, 10(6/7), July/Aug/Sept, pp. 246–249.
- (1983) "Planetary Influences on Metal Ion Activity", Correlation, 3(1), pp. 38–50.
- (1985) "Newton's Lunar Mass Error", Journal of the British Astronomical Association, 95, pp. 151–153.
- (1987) with George Farebrother (eds.) The Unnecessary War: Proceedings of the Belgrano Inquiry, November 7/8th 1986, The Belgrano Action Group, Nottingham: Spokesman Books.
- (1988) with Mike O'Neill. "The Eureka Effect: An Initial Report", Parts I and II, The Astrological Journal, Spring and Summer.
- (1990) "The Edmond Halley 'Bull's Eye' Enigma", Journal of the British Astronomical Association, 100, p. 7.
- (1991) "Crabtree's Venus-Transit Measurement", Quarterly Journal of the Royal Astronomical Society, 32, p. 51.
- (1991) "Newton's two 'Moon-tests'", The British Journal for the History of Science, 24(3), September, pp. 369–372. doi:10.1017/S0007087400027424
- (1992) "Thomas Simpson and 'Newton's method of approximation': An enduring myth", The British Journal for the History of Science, 25(3), September, pp. 347–354. doi:10.1017/S0007087400029150 JSTOR 4027257
- (1992) with Mike O'Neill. "Invention Moments and Aspects to Uranus", Correlation, 11(2), December, pp. 11–23.
- (1992) "The Hollow World of Edmond Halley", Journal for the History of Astronomy, 23, pp. 185–192.
- (1993) "Bio-Dynamic Constellation Division", Science Forum, 9, Spring, pp. 29–32.
- (1995) with Bernard D. Yallop. "Flamsteed's Lunar Data 1692–95, Sent to Newton", Journal for the History of Astronomy, 26, pp. 237–246.
- (1996) "'A Reintroduction of Epicycles': Newton's 1702 Lunar Theory and Halley's Saros Correction", Quarterly Journal of the Royal Astronomical Society, 36, pp. 357–368.
- (1999) "The Path of Halley's Comet, and Newton's Late Apprehension of the Law of Gravity", Annals of Science, 56(4), pp. 331–356. doi:10.1080/000337999296328
- (2000) "How Newton inspired China's calendar", Astronomy & Geophysics, 41(5), pp. 21–22. doi:10.1046/j.1468-4004.2000.41521.x
- (2000) with Camilla Power. "The influence of the lunar cycle on fertility on two thoroughbred studfarms", Equine Veterinary Journal, 32(1), January, pp. 75–77. doi:10.2746/042516400777612107 PMID 10661389
- (2001) with Gerhard Staudenmaier. "Evidence for Lunar-Sidereal Rhythms in Crop Yield: A Review", Journal Biological Agriculture & Horticulture, 19(3), pp. 247–259. doi:10.1080/01448765.2001.9754928
- (2002) "Newton, Halley and Uranus" Archived 23 September 2015 at the Wayback Machine, Astrological Journal, August.
- (2003) "Galileo as Believer" Archived 23 September 2015 at the Wayback Machine, Culture and Cosmos, 7(1), Spring/Summer.
- (2003) with Beverly Steffert. "Sex difference in response to stress by lunar month: A pilot study of four years' crisis-call frequency", BMC Psychiatry, 3(20), 10 December. doi:10.1186/1471-244X-3-20 PMID 14664724 PMC 317316
- (2003) "Recovering the Neptune files", Astronomy & Geophysics, 44(5), pp. 23–24.
- (2004) with William Sheehan, Craig B. Waff. "The Case of the Pilfered Planet: Did the British steal Neptune?", Scientific American, 291(6), December, pp. 92–99. doi:10.1038/scientificamerican1204-92 PMID 15597985
- (2004) "Galileo's first trial", Astronomy Now, 18(7), pp. 33–36.
- (2004) "Galileo and the new star", Astronomy Now, 18(10), pp. 58–59.
- (2004) "Lunar Effect on Thoroughbred Mare Fertility: An Analysis of 14 Years of Data, 1986–1999", Biological Rhythm Research, 35(4), pp. 317–327. doi:10.1080/0929-1010400000624
- (2004) "William Crabtree's Venus transit observation", Proceedings of the International Astronomical Union, IAUC196, pp. 34–40. doi:10.1017/S1743921305001249 Also in D. W. Kurtz (ed.), Transits of Venus: New Views of the Solar System and Galaxy, Cambridge University Press, 2005, p. 34ff.
- (2005) "Acropolis Width and Ancient Geodesy", International Journal of Metrology, Oct/Nov/Dec.
- (2006) "John Herschel on the Discovery of Neptune", Journal of Astronomical History and Heritage, 9(2), pp. 151–158.
- (2006) "An Hiatus in History: The British Claim for Neptune's Co-prediction, 1845–1846: Part 1", History of Science, 44, pp. 1–28.
- (2006) "An Hiatus in History: The British Claim for Neptune's Co-prediction, 1845–1846: Part 2", History of Science, 44(3), pp. 349–371.
- (2007) "Decoding the Antikythera Mechanism", Astronomy Now, 21(3), pp. 32–35.
- (2007) "Adams, John Couch", "Flamsteed, John", and "Newton, Isaac", in Thomas Hockey et al. (eds.), Biographical Encyclopedia of Astronomers, Springer, pp. 12–13, 373–374, 830–832.
- (2009) "The naming of Neptune" Archived 20 August 2018 at the Wayback Machine, Journal of Astronomical History and Heritage, 12(1), pp. 66–71.
