= The Richie Allen Show =

United Kingdom internet-based radio broadcast

The Richie Allen Show is a UK-based digital radio show and podcast hosted by Irish radio broadcaster and content creator Richie Allen, and broadcast from Salford, Greater Manchester. The show started in September 2014 and is currently broadcast four days a week: Monday to Thursday.

In 2019, after a number of Brexit Party MEPs appeared as guests in the show, anti-racist advocacy group Hope not Hate published a report on the far-right and antisemitic content of the show. This led to the Board of Deputies of British Jews issuing a statement against potential guests appearing on the show.

== Background ==
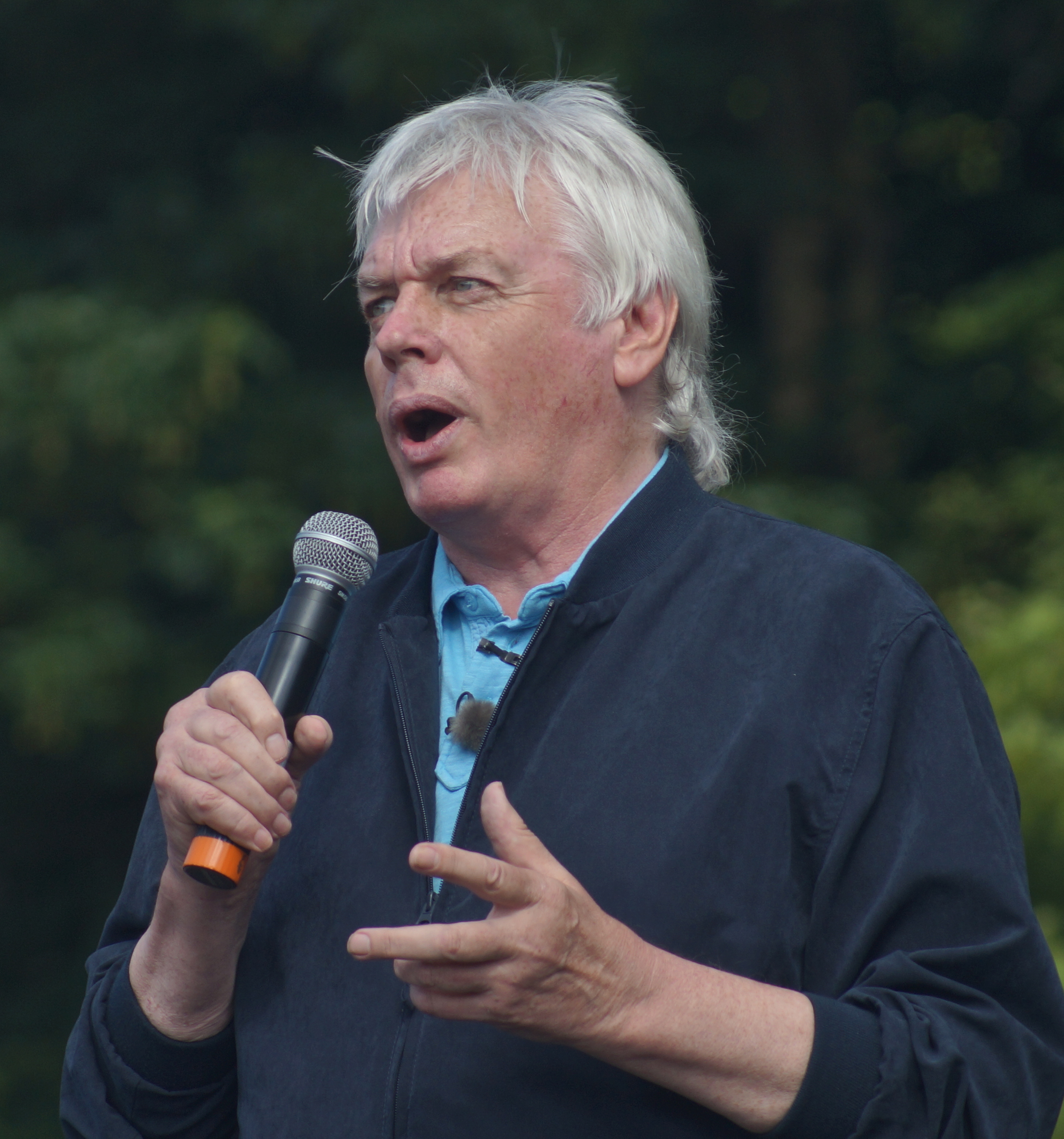
The conspiracy theorist David Icke (pictured) was described by Hope not Hate as a significant influence on Richie Allen.

Richie Allen is an Irish radio broadcaster and content creator. He began his career presenting late-night shows for a local radio station in Waterford, Ireland, where he later became the producer of the station's news show. Allen left Ireland to study TV and Radio at the University of Salford and later moved to Spain where he presented an evening show for Talk Radio Europe. In 2013, he relocated to London to present a daily television show for The People's Voice. A year later, following the closure of TPV, Allen relocated to northwest England, having initially been offered a new role as a breakfast show presenter for an unnamed commercial radio station. However he later turned down the offer after being persuaded by David Icke to present his current show instead. He is also active on YouTube, and has been active on his current channel since 2018 (after his original channel was banned for policy violations).

Richie Allen has been described by Hope not Hate as a "protégé of conspiracy theorist David Icke". The show (founded in 2014) "emerged from Icke's short-lived broadcast The People's Voice, and was for a time hosted on Icke's website". However Allen later rescinded the show's association with Icke and has since been operated independently by Allen himself. Hope not Hate have been described by Allen as "enemies of free speech" on his show.

Allen rejects the far-right label, and says he is a Bolivarian socialist opposed to identity politics, who interviews the right-wing more than the left "because it balances the show".

== Guests ==
The show hosted Nick Kollerstrom, a British Holocaust denier, on Holocaust Memorial Day 2016, wherein Kollerstrom rejected the existence of gas chambers at Auschwitz concentration camp. Although Allen made it clear that he disagreed with Kollerstrom, saying that Hitler and the Nazis "were killing people" and were "maniacal", he believed that the figure of six million Jews dying in the Holocaust was too high. Allen also praised Kollerstrom's conspiracy theories surrounding the 7 July 2005 terrorist bombings in London. Allen has also praised Alison Chabloz, who gained prominence following antisemitic musical performances at the far-right London Forum in 2016, that led to her being sentenced in June 2018 to a 20-week suspended prison sentence. Allen described Chabloz's songs as "very funny" on his show. James Fetzer, an American conspiracy theorist and Holocaust denier, has also been interviewed on the programme.

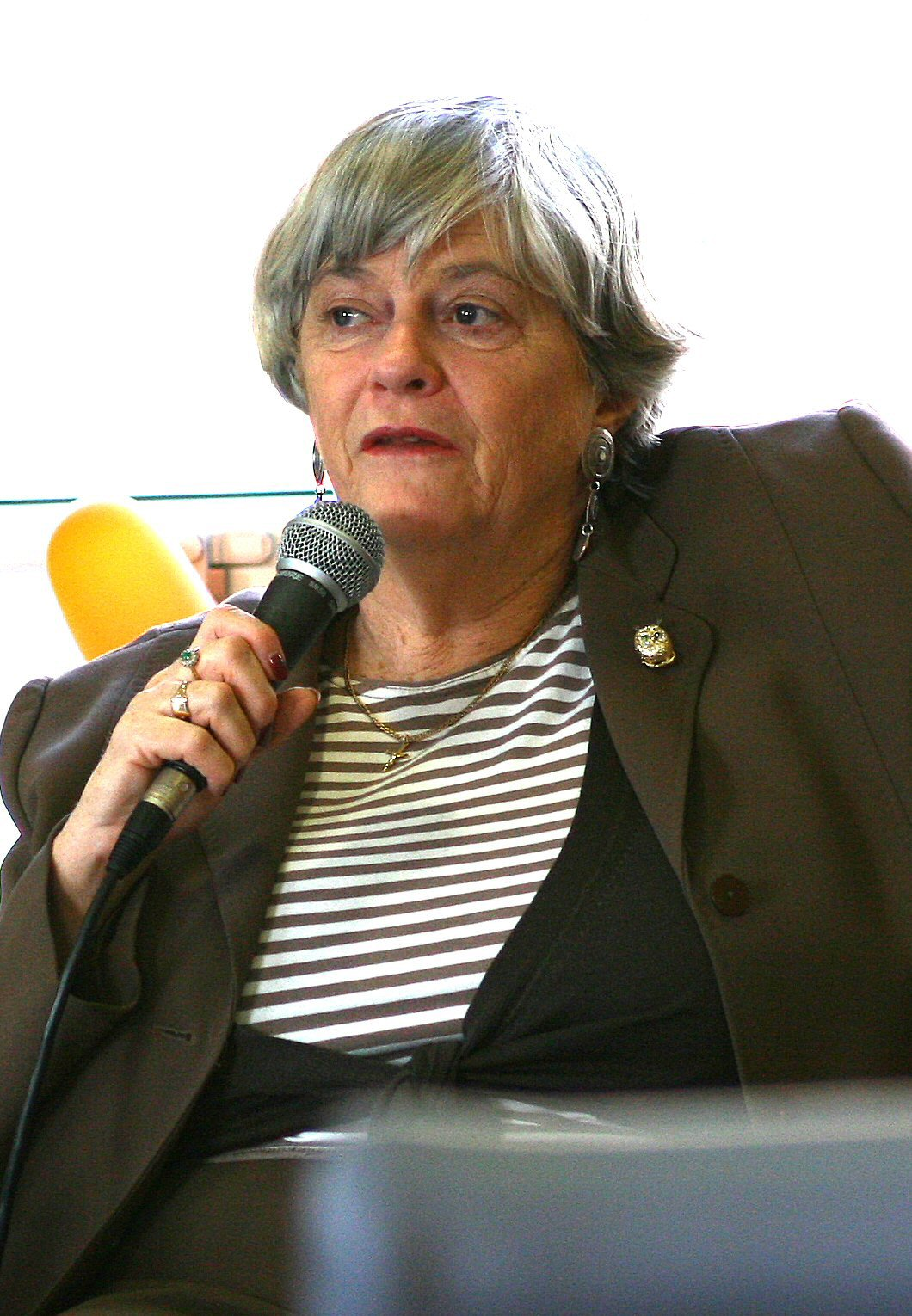
Ann Widdecombe (pictured) was one of the highest profile politicians who appeared on the programme.

In 2019, anti-racist advocacy group Hope not Hate released a report which said that Brexit Party figures appeared on the programme, on the same episodes as racist and antisemitic guests. This included Brexit Party MEP and former Member of Parliament Ann Widdecombe, as well as Brexit Party MEP, former television personality David Bull, and senior lecturer of Abertay University and PPC for Dundee West and unsuccessful MEP candidate in Scotland, Stuart Waiton. Widdecombe's appearance (15 August 2017) was succeeded by Kevin Barrett, an antisemitic 9/11 truther who claimed that the Charlottesville car attack and violence at the Unite the Right rally were false flags staged by the American government. Widdecombe was described as an "old friend of the show" by the host during one appearance. Widdecombe told The Jewish Chronicle that she agreed to appear to discuss Brexit, and that she "had never heard of the Richie Allen Show until I agreed to go on." She distanced herself from the programme's antisemitic content by, among other things, pointing to her membership of the Conservative Friends of Israel, B'nai B'rith event speeches, and her novel An Act of Treachery, which is set during the Holocaust.

Former television personality David Bull MEP appeared on the show on 30 April 2019, tweeting that the experience was a "pleasure" and linking to his interview via Conspiracy Daily Update, a website which contains numerous links to the show of former Ku Klux Klan leader David Duke and British neo-Nazi Mark Collett. The following guest on the episode was Lana Lokteff, an American white nationalist and co-host of the alt-right outlet Red Ice Radio. Although disagreeing with Lokteff on her views on racial identity, "white genocide" and belief in a "Jewish conspiracy", Allen repeatedly praised her for her intelligence, said he did not think she was racist, and praised her programme as "very important ... long may it continue". Following Hope not Hate's report, the Board of Deputies of British Jews said that potential guests should "stay far away" from the show.

Later that year, far-right conspiracy theorist Liz Crokin also appeared on the show to discuss then-recent Hollywood sexual abuse scandals; Crokin linked Hollywood paedophilia and the death of Seth Rich to supposed "rampant" paedophilia within the Jewish community. Other guests have included neo-Nazi and former British National Party activist Mark Collett and controversial jazz musician and commentator Gilad Atzmon in 2016. Guests connected to UKIP have included Welsh Assembly member Neil Hamilton, party founder Alan Sked and former party president in Scotland Christopher Monckton.

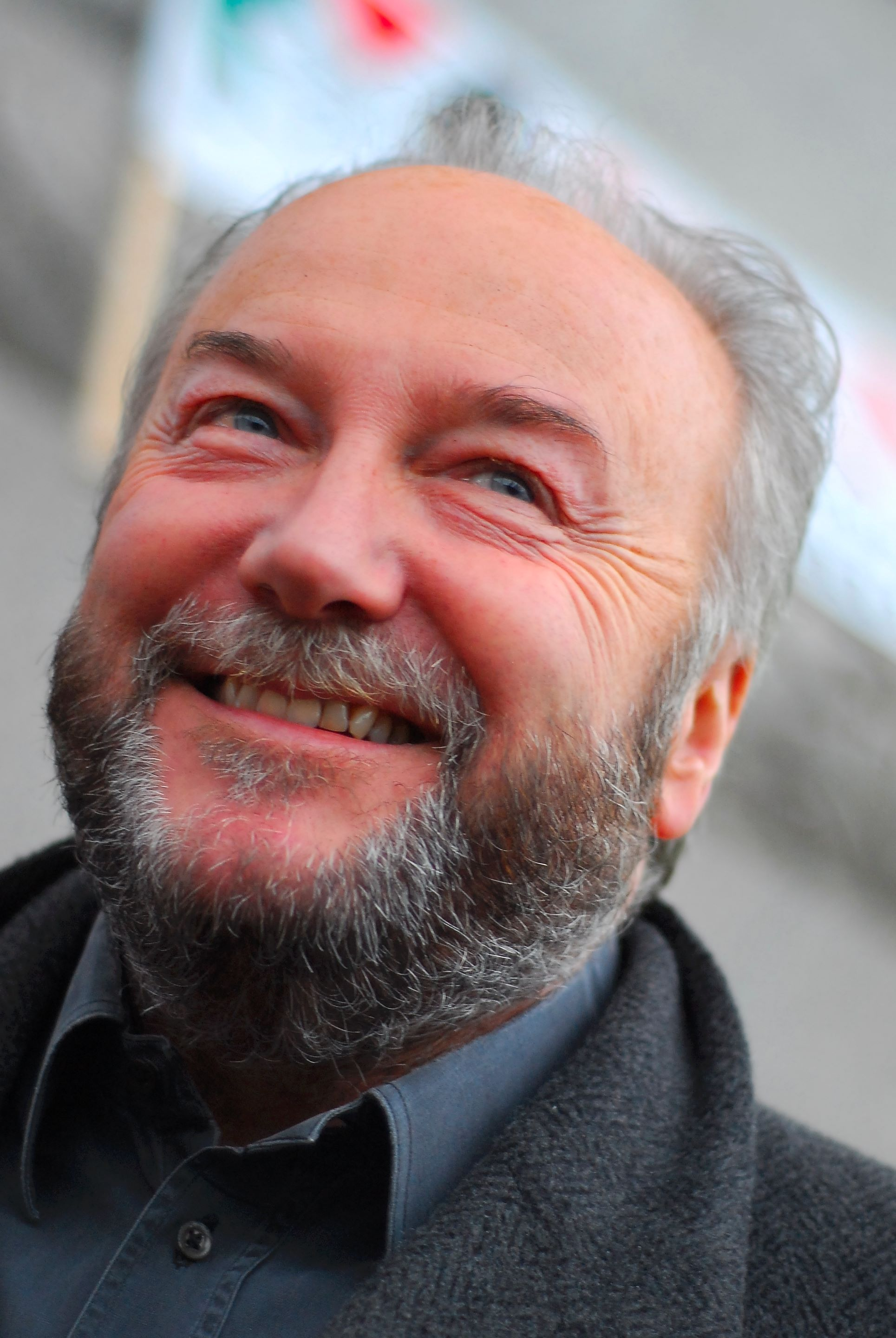
George Galloway (pictured) was one of a number of left-wing guests who appeared on the show.

Although generally catering to the far-right, a number of left-wing individuals have appeared on the show including former MP George Galloway, and editor-in-chief of The Canary, Kerry-Anne Mendoza. Brexit activist and climate change denier Piers Corbyn also appeared on the show. Human rights campaigner Peter Tatchell told The Jewish Chronicle: "I've been on The Richie Allen Show to defend trans people and to speak out against the alt-right and conspiracy theorists. Anyone who listened to my contributions would realise that I was opposed to far-right views and advocated a liberal and left-wing perspective." Liberal Democrats have also featured, including former minister Norman Baker, who suggested weapons inspector David Kelly was murdered, and John Hemming, who discussed "forced adoptions" on the show in 2016.

The chair of the Liverpool Wavertree Constituency Labour Party, Alex Scott-Samuel, a Jewish Voice For Labour activist, appeared on the show a number of times from 2017 until 2019. In one appearance, he described the Rothschild family as "behind a lot of the neo-liberal influence in the UK and the US" and accused them of profiting from wars, leading his former employer, the University of Liverpool, to distance itself from him. Labour MP Alex Sobel said Allen and Icke are "fermentors of antisemitic thought and draw people into a series of conspiracy theories... Sharing a platform with these men is incompatible with Labour membership".

In October 2020, Martin Kulldorff of Harvard Medical School appeared on the programme to oppose the COVID-19 lockdown. As a co-author of the Great Barrington Declaration, he favoured an approach based on herd immunity to the disease. Conservative Party MP Desmond Swayne appeared on the same edition of the show as James Fetzer in late 2020 to talk about the COVID-19 pandemic, asserting that deaths were similar to "a bad flu season" and questioning the validity of published case and death statistics.
