= Pedro Varela (disambiguation) =

Pedro Varela (1837–1906) was a Uruguayan politician who served as president from January 1875 to March 1876.

Pedro Varela may also refer to:

- Pedro Varela Sabando (born 1968), Chilean Army general, commander-in-chief
- Pedro Varela Geiss (born 1957), Spanish writer and neo-Nazi

== See also ==
- José Pedro Varela (1845–1879), Uruguayan politician and educator
