= Lionel Kopelowitz =

Anglo-Jewish community leader

- Preceded by: Greville Janner
- Succeeded by: Israel Finestein

41st President of the Board of Deputies of British Jews
- In office 1985–1991

President of the National Council for Soviet Jewry
- In office 1985–1991

Personal details
- Born: 9 December 1926

Jacob Lionel Garstein Kopelowitz JP MBE (9 December 1926 – 27 July 2019) was a British Jewish community leader and former President of the Board of Deputies of British Jews.

Kopelowitz was born in Newcastle upon Tyne but grew up in nearby Durham. He was educated at Clifton College before studying at the Trinity College at the University of Cambridge while training as a doctor at University College Hospital. He served in the Royal Air Force (1952–1953) before becoming a GP.

He was President of the Board of Deputies of British Jews and President of the National Council for Soviet Jewry from 1985–1991, while also pursuing an individual career as a GP and a key member of the British Medical Association.

He died on 27 July 2019 in London.
