= TPV =

TPV may refer to:

- Tampereen Pallo-Veikot, Finnish football club
- Temporary protection visa, document issued to refugees by Australia
- Thermophotovoltaic, conversion of heat to electricity by a photovoltaic process
- Thermoplastic Vulcanizate (thermoplastic elastomer), a material which both heat-moldable and elastic
- Third-party verification, confirmation by a third party of a transaction between two parties
- Tactical Protector Vehicle, a version of the Plasan Sand Cat sold by Oshkosh Defense
- TPV Technology, a Hong Kong–based electronics company
- The People's Voice (internet TV station) (2013–2014), an Internet television station founded by David Icke
- Today's Persian Version, see Bible translations into Persian
