= Phil Rosenberg =

Philip Rosenberg may refer to:

- Phil Rosenberg (Jewish leader), President-Elect of the Board of Deputies of British Jews
- Philip Rosenberg (born 1935), American production designer
