= Dannie-Lu Carr =

British theatre director and author

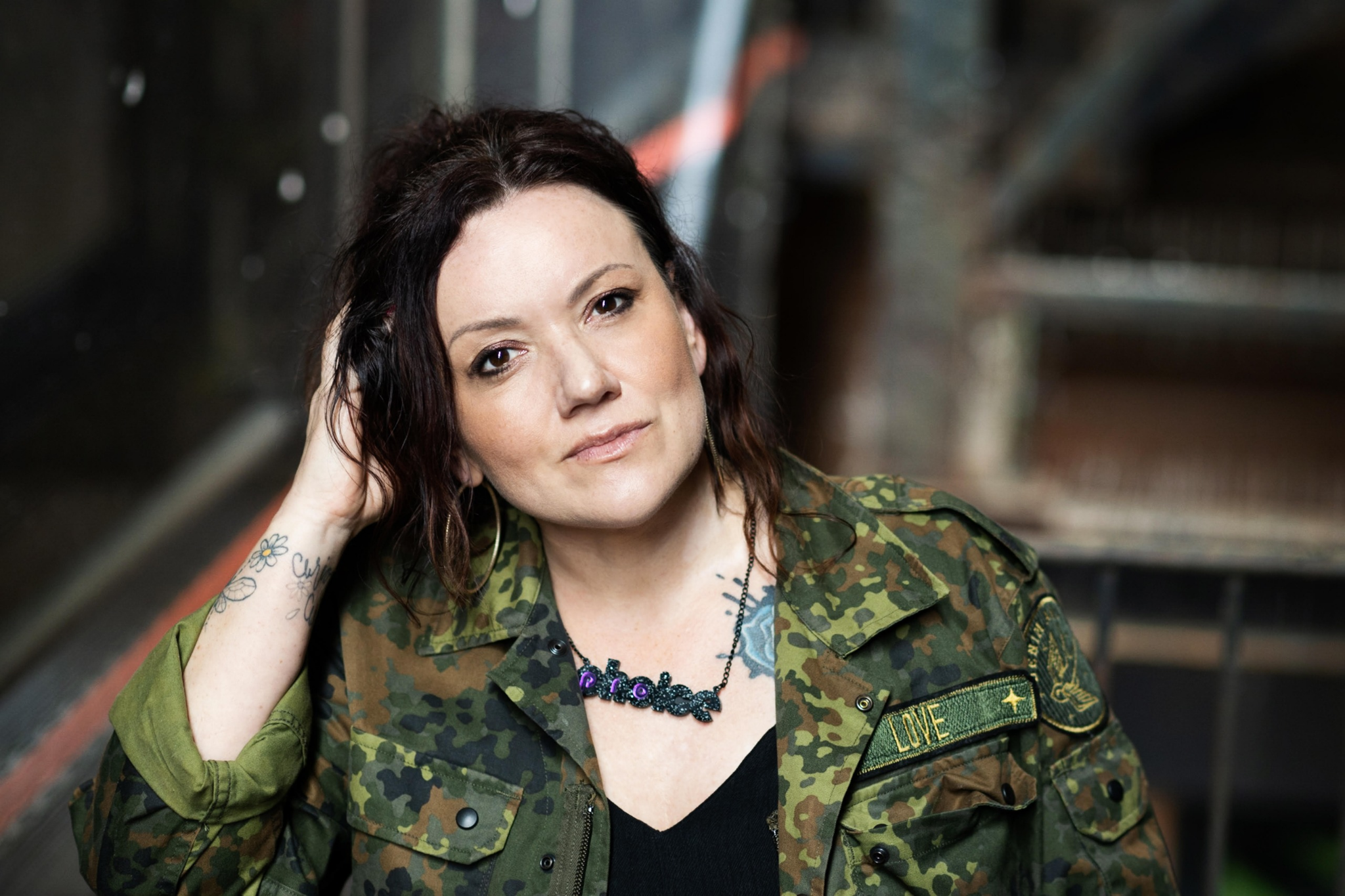
- Other names: Dannie Carr; Louise Danielle Carr
- Occupations: Theatre director Actress; Singer-songwriter; Author Executive coach
- Notable work: Directing Fool for Love (Compagnie du Vingt-Trois); Brilliant Assertiveness (2012); Chunky Bitty Mermaid (2023)
- Website: www.dannielucarr.com www.dannielucarrmusic.com www.portfoliodlc.com

Dannie-Lu Carr is a British theatre director, actress, singer-songwriter and author who was born in Newcastle-upon-Tyne. She directed the Compagnie du Vingt-Trois production of Sam Shepard's Fool for Love, staged in Paris and at the Festival Off d'Avignon and, credited as Dannie Carr, voiced the character Morli in the Big Finish Productions audio drama series Dalek Empire. She wrote the self-help book Brilliant Assertiveness (2012) and released her debut album, Chunky Bitty Mermaid, in 2023. She also works as an executive coach, public speaking coach and a training consultant specialising in communication and leadership.

== Career ==
=== Theatre ===
Carr directed the Paris-based Compagnie du Vingt-Trois in Sam Shepard's Fool for Love, performed in English with French surtitles at the Théâtre Pixel in Avignon during the Festival Off d'Avignon. The cast comprised Olivier Raynal, Julie Zeno, Lee Michelsen and Dimitri Michelsen. Reviewing the production for BroadwayWorld in 2018, Wesley Doucette described Carr's direction as "strong and clear". The production returned to the Festival Off d'Avignon in 2019, where it was reviewed by the French theatre website L'Œil d'Olivier. That year the festival's small-venue productions were eligible for the P'tits Molières, a French award scheme for theatres of fewer than 150 seats, which held an Avignon edition for the first time in 2019 in partnership with France Bleu Vaucluse; Carr won a 2019 Petits Molières award for the production.

In 2021, Carr directed Federico García Lorca's The House of Bernarda Alba at the Cockpit Theatre in London, performed by graduating actors of the Bridge Theatre Training Company.

Some of her other directing credits include Top Girls (1998) and Under Milk Wood (2001) at the Cockpit Theatre; Marat/Sade (1999), Animal Farm (2000) and The Gut Girls (2001) at the Broadway Theatre, Catford; and Spooky Ship (2002), which she wrote and staged aboard HMS Belfast. Her work also includes the short film Things to Remember (2014), which she wrote and Chamber Music / Sing to Me Through Open Windows at the Giles Foreman Centre for Acting, London (2016).

Carr trained for two years in the Meisner technique with Scott Williams at the Impulse Company in London, and is a specialist in the technique; she taught as a Meisner technique specialist at City Lit in London between 2006-2015 and the Giles Foreman Centre for Acting in London and Paris between 2016 and 2022.

=== Acting and voice work ===
Credited as Dannie Carr, she played Morli in the Big Finish Productions audio drama series Dalek Empire II: Dalek War (2003) and Dalek Empire III (2004), both written and directed by Nicholas Briggs. The casts of the series also included Sarah Mowat, Gareth Thomas and David Tennant.

Her voiceover work includes television trailers for the BBC Three series Burn It, narration for professional cycling coverage broadcast on Eurosport, and voiceover work for the BBC, Channel 4 and Sky Sports. She has voiced advertising campaigns including KFC's Christmas advertising and the Christmas campaigns of the homelessness charity Crisis.

As a stage actress, her roles have included Martha in Who's Afraid of Virginia Woolf? and Puck in A Midsummer Night's Dream.

=== Writing ===
Carr's book Brilliant Assertiveness: What the Most Assertive People Know, Do and Say was published by Pearson Education in 2012 as part of its Brilliant Lifeskills series.

She has contributed to Influence, the magazine of the Chartered Institute of Public Relations (CIPR), writing on subjects including emotional intelligence.

In 2016, she was a contributing author to Real Ambition: Quit Dreaming and Create Success Your Way, a personal development book produced by Psychologies magazine and published by Capstone.

=== Music ===
Carr's debut album, Chunky Bitty Mermaid, was released by the independent label Pastiche Records in October 2023. Produced by Sarah Gillespie, it is a concept album following a mermaid in a dystopian future London and addresses themes including identity and climate change. Reviewing the album for Creatrix, the composer Vik Sharma compared Carr's singing to that of Marianne Faithfull and her arrangements to the work of Pascal Comelade and Imelda May. A four-track EP, Epic Little Monsters, produced by John Nicholls, followed in January 2025.

=== Coaching and speaking ===
Carr works as a training consultant and executive coach, and holds an ILM Level 7 qualification in executive coaching. She set up Dannie-Lu Carr Creative in 2012 to work internationally with leaders, teams and organisations, blending strategic thinking, behavioural insight and creative approaches. She works with a range of sectors and has developed and co-developed programmes on subjects including leadership development, negotiation, strategic communication, presentation and speaking skills and women in leadership.

=== Podcasting and advocacy ===
Carr created and co-hosted the podcast It's a Bit More Complicated Than That with Rebecca Tully, which gives voice to the complexities of childlessness, childfreeness and parenthood. Childless not by choice herself, she is an advocate for greater understanding of involuntary childlessness, and supports childless people as a practitioner listed with the Gateway Women network.

== Discography ==
- Chunky Bitty Mermaid (Pastiche Records, 2023)
- Epic Little Monsters (EP, 2025)

== Bibliography ==
- Carr, Dannie Lu (2012). Brilliant Assertiveness: What the Most Assertive People Know, Do and Say. Brilliant Lifeskills. Pearson Education. ISBN 978-0-273-76867-8.
- Psychologies Magazine (2016). Real Ambition: Quit Dreaming and Create Success Your Way. Capstone. ISBN 978-0-85708-663-1. (contributing author)
