= Jonathan Arkush =

British barrister and Jewish community leader

47th President of the Board of Deputies of British Jews
- In office 17 May 2015 – 13 May 2018
- Preceded by: Vivian Wineman
- Succeeded by: Marie van der Zyl

Personal details
- Born: June 1954 (age 72)

Jonathan Harry Samuel Arkush OBE (born June 1954) is a British barrister and Jewish community leader. Arkush served as the 47th President of the Board of Deputies of British Jews from 17 May 2015 to 13 May 2018.

== Board of Deputies ==
Arkush was elected president of the Board of Deputies of British Jews on 17 May 2015, succeeding Vivian Wineman. That year, he denounced the far-right Holocaust-denialist group, the London Forum, as white supremacist.

In January 2017, Arkush described United Nations Security Council Resolution 2334 – a 2016 resolution condemning Israeli settlements in the Palestinian territories – as a "disgrace" at a protest against the resolution in central London. He said that he had sent a message to the Prime Minister, Theresa May, on Christmas Day to express his anger at British support for the resolution. Later on that year, he advised Jewish students not to attend university at the University College London due to an allegedly hostile environment towards Jewish students.

In 2018, Arkush was critical of alleged antisemitism within the Labour Party under the leadership of Jeremy Corbyn. He said that Corbyn's views were hostile to Jewish people and would drive Jewish people away from Britain. He was also critical of the Archbishop of Canterbury, Justin Welby, for his alleged failure to stand up to anti-Jewish prejudice.

In January 2018, Arkush announced he would not run for a second term as president of the Board. In an interview with The Jewish Chronicle, Arkush stressed that his reasons for leaving office were not professional, but that he felt he had gone a long way towards achieving his manifesto aims and that "the record of second terms for Board presidents, if you go back, is never as good as the first". He also stated his intention to make aliyah, something he described as an "increasingly urgent personal priority". He was succeeded by Marie van der Zyl on 13 May 2018.

Arkush was appointed Officer of the Order of the British Empire (OBE) in the 2023 New Year Honours for services to faith and integration.

== Post-Board of Deputies ==
After leaving the Board of Deputies, Arkush has spoken about the rise of antisemitic incidents in Britain and Europe in 2021.
