= CEDADE =

Spanish neo-Nazi group

Spanish Circle of Friends of Europe Círculo Español de Amigos de Europa
- Abbreviation: CEDADE
- Leader: Ángel Ricote; Pedro Aparicio; Pedro Varela Geiss
- Founded: 1966
- Dissolved: 1993
- Headquarters: Barcelona
- Ideology: Neo-Nazism

Party flag

The Spanish Circle of Friends of Europe (Spanish: Círculo Español de Amigos de Europa; CEDADE) was a Spanish neo-Nazi group that concerned itself with co-ordinating international activity and publishing.

== History ==
The group began life in 1966, under Francisco Franco's rule, ostensibly as a society for the appreciation of Richard Wagner but before long it had taken on a neo-Nazi dimension, influenced by the likes of Otto Skorzeny, who was a founding member. Counting Léon Degrelle among its leading members, the Circle became a study group and publishing house for materials relating to Nazism and Holocaust denial, with a remit towards closer cooperation across Europe. Initially led by Ángel Ricote, the group looked towards Italian fascism for inspiration, but under Pedro Aparicio it moved towards a Nazi position.

CEDADE, whose headquarters were located in Barcelona, established a branch in Madrid in 1973. The group had 2,500 Spanish members by 1985, with smaller groups also active elsewhere. Among those associated with the group was Klaus Georg Barbie, the son of Klaus Barbie, who was revealed by El País to have worked closely with CEDADE whilst living in Barcelona between 1965 and 1978. Internationally CEDADE also maintained close links to the likes of Mark Fredriksen, Bela Ewald Althans, Povl Riis-Knudsen, Salvador Borrego, Wilfred von Oven, Pekka Siitoin and Richard Edmonds. Secretary Jordi Mota also established links between CEDADE and Klaus Barbie, with whom Mota was on friendly terms.

Taking a European outlook, it set up groups in France, as well as in Latin America and registered as a political party in 1979 under the name of Partido Europeo Nacional Revolucionario (European National Revolutionary Party), although this initiative was not pursued. As a publishing house, however, CEDADE continued to grow and was soon publishing for a number of movements in Austria and Germany. Using the name Ediciones Wotan for this initiative, it published works by the likes of Degrelle and Francis Parker Yockey and collaborated closely with the Liberty Lobby in the United States.

Financial difficulties forced a major scaling down in activities around 1989–90, although the group hosted an international centenary celebration of Adolf Hitler's birthday in 1989. The problems inherent in the movement persisted and it was officially dissolved in October 1993. Members drifted away into various movements, with only Project IES representing a serious attempt at refoundation. This group was ultimately merged into a far-right party, National Democracy.

== See also ==
- Los TECOS
