= Keep Talking =

Keep Talking may refer to:

== Songs ==
- "Keep Talking" (Cyrus song)
- "Keep Talking" (Pink Floyd song)
- "Keep Talking", a song by Rita Ora from Phoenix

== Other uses ==
- Keep Talking (game show), a 1958–1960 American game show
- Keep Talking (group), a conspiracy and Holocaust-denial group in the United Kingdom

== See also ==
- Keep Talking and Nobody Explodes, a 2015 video game
