= Jennifer Bartlett (astronomer) =

American astronomer

Jennifer Lynn Bartlett is an American astronomer, the Kinnear Chair of Physics at the United States Naval Academy, and former Chief of the Software Products Division in the Astronomical Applications Department of the United States Naval Observatory. Her interests include the development of software for astrometry, the accurate measurements of distances to nearby stars, celestial navigation, the effects of the atmosphere on the brightness of the sky and celestial objects, the history of astronomy, and the preservation of historical astronomical data.

== Education and career ==
Bartlett has held a lifelong interest in astronomy and was given her first telescope as a teenager. After beginning her undergraduate education at the University of California, Berkeley, she transferred to the Rensselaer Polytechnic Institute, and earned a bachelor's degree in physics there, in 1990. After working in the computer and aerospace industries, she returned to graduate study at the University of Virginia in 1997, and earned a Ph.D. there in 2007. Her dissertation, Knowing Our Neighbors: Fundamental Properties of Nearby Stars, was directed by Philip A. Ianna.

While completing her doctorate, Bartlett was a visiting assistant professor at Hampden–Sydney College in Virginia. She began working for the United States Naval Observatory in 2007, and in 2010 became Chief of the Software Products Division in the Astronomical Applications Department. She moved to the United States Naval Academy as Kinnear Chair of Physics in 2021.

== Books ==
Bartlett is a coauthor of the book Solar System: Between Fire and Ice (with Thomas Hockey and Daniel C. Boice, CRC Press, 2021).

She became co-editor-in-chief of the Biographical Encyclopedia of Astronomers in 2020.

== Recognition ==
Bartlett was named a Legacy Fellow of the American Astronomical Society in 2020.
