= A Guide to the Perplexed =

2001 novel by Gilad Atzmon

- Author: Gilad Atzmon
- Translator: Philip Simpson
- Language: English
- Genre: Novel
- Publisher: Serpent's Tail (Eng. trans.)
- Publication date: 2001
- Publication place: United States
- Media type: Print (Paperback)
- ISBN: 1-85242-826-0

A Guide to the Perplexed (originally in Hebrew: מוֹרֵה נְבוּכִים, Mōrē Nəḇūḵīm) is a novel written in 2001 by British musician and anti-Zionist campaigner Gilad Atzmon, who has been described as antisemitic.

== Synopsis ==
The novel is presented in the form of unfinished memoirs of one Professor Gunther Wünker, born in Ramat Gan, Israel in the 1960s, an anti-Zionist and the founder of the philosophical school of 'Peepology' (the science of peep-show voyeurism). The novel takes place in a fictitious near-future period, some 40 years after the State of Israel is dismantled and replaced with the State of Palestine. The novel excoriates what it calls exploitation of The Holocaust for propaganda purposes designed to shield Israel from scrutiny for its "transgressions" against the Palestinians. The perplexed is defined as "the unthinking chosen" who "cling to clods of earth that don't belong to them".

== Reviews ==
Matthew J. Reisz for The Independent wrote that "As a viciously black satire on Israeli life" the book "is grandiose, childish and nasty, but with just enough connection with reality to give it a certain unsettling power" while Darren King in The Observer commented that "it works because Atzmon writes with so much style and his gags are so hilarious".

== Translations ==
The English translation by Philip Simpson was published by Serpent's Tail. The Spanish translation La Guia de Perplejos was published by Emece Editores. It has also been translated into German by Gabriela Hegedus as Anleitung für Zweifelnde.
