= Marie van der Zyl =

48th President of the Board of Deputies of British Jews

Marie Sarah van der Zyl OBE (née Kaye; born November 1965) is an English lawyer who was president of the Board of Deputies of British Jews from 2018 to 2024. When she was first elected in May 2018, she was only the second female president in the 258-year history of the organisation.

== Early life and career ==
She was born in the London Borough of Redbridge, the daughter of Barry Kaye, who was in tailoring, and his wife Szusanne, a beautician, and grew up in South Woodford, London, where she attended the local comprehensive school. She took a law degree at Liverpool Polytechnic (now Liverpool John Moores University).

She qualified as a solicitor in 1991, specialising in employment law. In 2001 she joined Davenport Lyons where, in 2012, she defended Stringfellows nightclub in Stringfellow Restaurants Ltd v Quashie by asserting that the claimant, a lap dancer, was self-employed. In 2019 she acted for 27 art and history experts at the National Gallery who had not been given any paid holiday, sick pay, pension or maternity pay despite paying taxes through the payroll. The case, which they won, was reported to be one of the first in the UK public sector about workers' rights.

After Davenport Lyons went into administration in 2014 its practice was taken over by Gordon Dadds where she became a partner, and subsequently a partner at Ince Gordon Dadds after Gordon Dadds took over Ince & Co's practice in 2018. In 2023, Ince Gordon Dadds itself went into administration, and she joined Keystone Law as a partner in June 2023.

== Board of Deputies of British Jews ==
Van der Zyl was initially a deputy for the Jewish Lads' and Girls' Brigade. She took office as President of the Board of Deputies of British Jews on 1 June 2018, succeeding Jonathan Arkush, who did not seek re-election. She was the second ever woman and the fourth lawyer in a row to hold the role. She was re-elected in May 2021 and stood down in 2024 at the end of her second term of office.

Her visits to her grandparents gave her, she says, "a great passion for Israel" and she has sought "to promote a sympathetic understanding of Israel". She has pledged to "defend Israel's legitimacy and its centrality to Jewish identity". She is a self-described "fighter" and takes as a compliment the comparison that "the only difference between me and a Rottweiler is that a Rottweiler eventually lets go".

In December 2019, the Board of Deputies invited all general election candidates to sign up to ten commitments in the Board's Jewish manifesto. Commenting on the support that had been received, van der Zyl said: "In an increasingly bitter political climate, it is encouraging to see that politicians of all parties can come together to support British Jews." A month later, as candidates came forward to contest the vacancy for Labour Party leader, she said that antisemitism "became a matter of great anxiety for the UK's Jews" during Jeremy Corbyn's leadership.

During her Board of Deputies presidency she met Pope Francis to improve Jewish-Catholic relations and worked with Justin Welby, the Archbishop of Canterbury, who spoke at a historic landmark event in Bevis Marks Synagogue in 2023. She held a number of interfaith seders and worked with other minorities in defending religious practice and in highlighting the plight of the Uyghurs.

In February 2023 she attended the opening in Abu Dhabi of the Abrahamic Family House which includes the purpose-built Moses Ben Maimon Synagogue, a church and a mosque. Later that year she took part in a two-day visit to Qatar as part of a World Jewish Congress (WJC) delegation, led by WJC president Ronald Lauder, that sought and secured the Qataris' commitment to the release of the hostages taken from Israel by Hamas.

She worked with historian and author Simon Sebag Montefiore to organise a reception, hosted by Prince Charles at Buckingham Palace in December 2019, to celebrate Britain's Jewish community. She attended the celebrations for the Platinum Jubilee of Queen Elizabeth II in 2022 and led the interfaith procession at the Queen's state funeral. In March 2023 she led a delegation of Jewish communal representatives to petition King Charles III before his coronation, which she also attended.

In June 2020, sparked by responses to the murder of George Floyd, she commissioned a report from journalist Stephen Bush on racial inclusivity in the Jewish community. The commission chaired by Bush published its report in April 2021. Paying tribute to Bush for his work and to those who provided testimony to the commission, van der Zyl said: "This is the first occasion that we know of that any Jewish community, anywhere, has published such a comprehensive audit of itself, backed by its national representative body. I sincerely hope the Commission serves as a starting point for a wider conversation in our community and in wider society about how to tackle and defeat the scourge of racism."

In November 2020, at the UK government's Holocaust Memorial inquiry, she gave evidence in support of the proposed national memorial and of siting it close to the Palace of Westminster.

In 2023 she was appointed by Anne Frank Trust UK to chair the advisory group overseeing an independent review of the Trust's education provision; the report was published in February 2024.

In December 2021, she criticised the BBC's coverage of an antisemitic attack on Jewish teenagers who had been celebrating Chanukah in central London, and described as "fiction" the suggestion that the attackers had been reacting to an anti-Muslim slur. In January 2022 she welcomed the findings of the BBC's editorial complaints unit that the broadcaster "did not meet standards of due accuracy and impartiality" when it covered the incident, but continued to be critical of the BBC's handling of the issue. However, in December 2022, Jewish News reported that she had said to attendees at the Limmud Festival that it was "very important to try and restore relationships with the BBC; they do a lot of good work. At the moment there are discussions with the Director General because dialogue is very important for the community; we want to make sure this doesn't happen again and things get better.”

During her presidency, van der Zyl spoke on radio and television including Question Time, Newsnight and BBC Radio 4's Today programme.

=== Antisemitism ===
In February 2024, she said she was not satisfied with the BBC's response to the Board of Deputies' allegations that Asif Munaf, a contestant on The Apprentice TV show, had made "vile antisemitic comments" on social media.

She sat on the Labour Party's antisemitism advisory board that was established in 2020 and sought to eliminate antisemitism in the party.

In 2023, she successfully brought a case found before a church tribunal against retired vicar Stephen Sizer who was banned, for twelve years, from ministry in the Church of England after sharing "virulently antisemitic" material.

=== COVID-19 pandemic ===
Van der Zyl led Britain's Jewish community during the COVID-19 pandemic. She worked with Muslim leaders in the UK in successfully calling on the government to amend its emergency legislation on cremation and burial, so as to respect Jewish and Muslim religious traditions. In February 2022 she described the "sombre milestone" reached by the Jewish community as the number of Jews to die from COVID-19 since the pandemic began exceeded 1000.

== Other roles ==
Van der Zyl is a long-standing member of West London Synagogue, where she has been a member of the management board, and is also an associate member of Mill Hill United Synagogue. She was a trustee of the Jewish Leadership Council and is currently a trustee of the Claims Conference and the Holocaust Memorial Day Trust.

In 2023 she was appointed as the World Jewish Congress Commissioner for Gender Equality and Inclusion.

== Recognition and honours ==
In 2018, The Jerusalem Post ranked her as the 40th most influential Jew of that year. She was also ranked the 47th most influential Jew in 2023, being described as "one of the leaders of some of the largest Jewish communities in the world [who] help keep Jewish life worldwide safe, vibrant, and thriving".

In the 2023 New Year Honours she was appointed Officer of the Order of the British Empire (OBE) for services to faith and integration.

== Personal life ==
Marie van der Zyl lives in Mill Hill, London. She has two daughters with her first husband, Darell van der Zyl, son of voice actress Nikki van der Zyl, whose father was Rabbi Werner van der Zyl. In September 2022 she married Adrian Cohen, a banking and finance lawyer, at West London Synagogue.

She joined the Labour Party in June 2024, after stepping down from her Board of Deputies role.
