= Millennial Woes =

Scottish former YouTuber and white supremacist

- Born: Colin Robertson
- Occupation: Social media personality
- Years active: 2013–present
- Website: millennialwoes.com

Colin Robertson, known as Millennial Woes or simply Woes, is a Scottish former YouTuber, white supremacist, and antisemitic conspiracy theorist.

Robertson was previously aligned with the neo-fascist group Patriotic Alternative, but after a falling-out with them in 2020, his public influence has significantly diminished.

Robertson has supported slavery, called for the bombing of refugees crossing the Mediterranean, and endorsed the white genocide conspiracy theory.

== Career ==
Robertson attended an art college in London in the mid-2000s. He launched his YouTube channel at the end of 2013.

Robertson delivered a speech at the National Policy Institute Conference in November 2016, in Washington DC.

In January 2017, Robertson began receiving coverage from BBC News and national newspapers, after Scottish tabloid the Daily Record doxxed Millennial Woes, exposing his birth name, family's home address and sending reporters and photographers to his parents' home to try to find him. Robertson was reported to have "left Britain", posting a video to his YouTube channel named "Fugitive Woes".

On 4 February 2017, Robertson gave a speech entitled "Withnail and I as Viewed From the Right" at The London Forum in Kensington, On 25 February 2017, Robertson gave a speech at a white nationalist event in Stockholm organised by Motpol. On 1 July 2017, he appeared at the far-right Scandza Forum's "Globalism v the Ethnostate" conference in Oslo.

In August 2017, Salon described Millennial Woes as one of only a few alt-right platforms to rapidly grow, alongside Red Ice, VDARE and The Rebel Media.

On 10 December 2017, he began an interview series named Millenniyule 2017, inviting various internet personalities from the alt-right movement, including an appearance from Faith Goldy.

Until 2020, Robertson was aligned with the neo-fascist group Patriotic Alternative until that group distanced themselves from him following multiple allegations of sexual misconduct. Since then, according to Hope Not Hate, Robertson's influence has been "radically diminished".

== Views ==
Robertson is a proponent of the white genocide conspiracy theory. He has claimed in interviews that "there are problems with the Jewish people". According to anti-racism and anti-fascism research group Hope Not Hate, Robertson is known for supporting slavery, and has called for the bombing of refugees crossing the Mediterranean.
