= Salvador Borrego =

Mexican journalist and writer (1915–2018)

Salvador Borrego Escalante
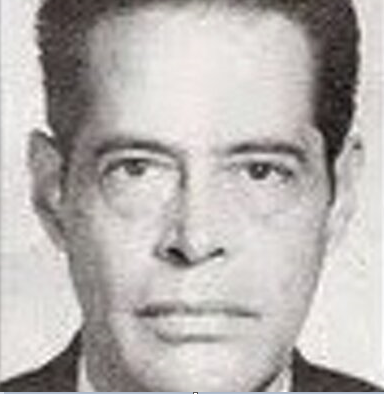
- Born: Salvador Borrego Escalante; 24 April 1915; Mexico City, Mexico
- Died: 8 January 2018 (aged 102); Mexico City, Mexico
- Occupation: Writer

Salvador Borrego Escalante (24 April 1915 – 8 January 2018) was a Mexican journalist and historical revisionist writer.

He published fifty-three books in fields such as military history, politics, economics, journalism, philosophy and religion. His work bore heavy criticism and he has been accused of antisemitism because he places international Jewish capital and Zionist ideology as the cause of World War II.

Borrego has been considered by some critics and readers as an apologist and sympathizer of fascism.

== Biography ==
Salvador Borrego was born on April 24, 1915 in Mexico City, being the second son of the marriage of Onésimo Borrego Lozano and Otilia Escalante. He spent his childhood between the cities of Durango and Gómez Palacio. In 1932 he was orphaned by his mother, so his family moved to Torreon. In that year he joined the Mexican Army, where he was a line soldier and then a corporal, but he left in 1934 when he had no chance to climb the military ranks.

Borrego began his career in journalism in 1936, as a reporter of the Mexican newspaper Excélsior where he eventually was appointed editor-in-chief. He became a Nazi sympathizer in 1937, when Borrego perceived an anti-German bias in the Mexican mass media, allegedly fostered by a lobby of pro-Western advertisers.

He has written several books, including Derrota Mundial ("Worldwide Defeat"), published on 1953, in which he claims that the defeat of Adolf Hitler and Nazi Germany was a defeat for the entire world because the Nazis were fighting against what they believed to be an international Jewish evil, and their plan to take over the global economy. In América Peligra ("The Americas in Danger"), published in 1964, he focuses the story on what he asserts is an international Jewish conspiracy to provide what he claims to be the true account of the unfolding of historical events in Mexico and Latin America.

In 1996 Catalan police closed a bookstore managed by Spanish Neo-Nazi Pedro Varela, and confiscated a host of Nazi books and publications, including those of Salvador Borrego. Varela was arrested, but the bookstore opened again several months later. Borrego turned 100 on 24 April 2015.

On 8 January 2018, Borrego died at the age of 102.

== See also ==
- Carlos Cuesta Gallardo
