= Phil Rosenberg (Jewish leader) =

49th President of the Board of Deputies of British Jews

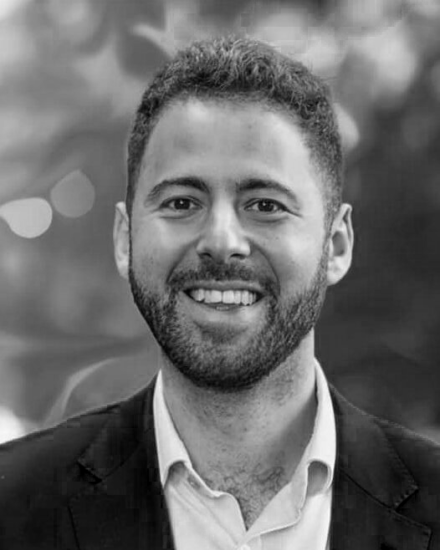
Phil Rosenberg

Phil Rosenberg (born 1986) is a former Labour councillor and current President of the Board of Deputies of British Jews. He was elected in May 2024.

== Early life and career ==
Rosenberg was educated at the City of London School and then read Hebrew, Arabic and Spanish at the University of Oxford.

He served as a Labour councillor for the West Hampstead ward on the London Borough of Camden from 2014 to 2018.

Rosenberg is a consultant specialising in government relations, media, faith and diplomacy and previously director of the Faiths Forum for London. He served as the director of public affairs at the board before being elected president.

Rosenberg became president of the Board of Deputies of British Jews on 1 June 2024, succeeding Marie van der Zyl, becoming the 49th president. Aged 38 on taking office, he is the Board's youngest ever President.

== Political career ==
Rosenberg's involvement in public service began early in his career. He served as a Labour councillor for the West Hampstead ward on the London Borough of Camden from 2014 to 2018. During his tenure, he served in a number of roles:

- Co-chair of the Camden Faith Leaders Forum
- Member of the Planning Committee
- Member of the Culture and Environment Scrutiny Committee
- Member of the SACRE (Standing Advisory Council for Religious Education)

As a councillor, Rosenberg was known for his community engagement, including running a campaign to save West Hampstead Library. However, he was accused by one of his Labour ward colleagues of this being a sham campaign, leading to her resigning from the Labour Party.

== Interfaith work ==
Prior to his role at the Board of Deputies, Rosenberg served as the Director of the Faiths Forum for London. This position allowed him to work extensively in interfaith relations, managing relationships between various religious denominations.

While at University, he had previously been co-director of a Muslim-Jewish dialogue group called 'MuJewz' at Oxford University and run an Arab-Jewish dialogue group at Hebrew University in Jerusalem during his year abroad. During that year he visited most Israeli and Palestinian cities to try and get a deeper understanding of the conflict.

== Government and diplomatic experience ==
After completing an internship at the Foreign Office, Rosenberg worked at the Ministry of Defence. This experience provided him with insights into government operations and international relations.

== Board of Deputies ==
Rosenberg's involvement with the Board of Deputies began before his presidency. His first permanent job was as the Board of Deputies' Interfaith Officer and he went on to be its Interfaith and Social Action Manager. When he left to work at the Faiths Forum for London, he returned to the Board of Deputies as an under-35 Observer for Barnet United Synagogue. He then returned to the Board of Deputies as staff, serving as the organisation's Director of Public Affairs from June 2013 to January 2022. In this role, he was responsible for formulating responses to UK and world events, including addressing antisemitism in Jeremy Corbyn's Labour Party and managing issues related to various political and social challenges, such as Brexit and COVID-19.

=== Presidency of the Board of Deputies ===
Rosenberg was elected as the 49th President of the Board of Deputies of British Jews on May 12, 2024. He succeeded Marie van der Zyl, who stepped down after serving the maximum two terms in office.

The election was a closely contested race, with Rosenberg emerging victorious against other prominent candidates, including Amanda Bowman, Michael Ziff, and Sheila Gewolb.

==== Significance of his Presidency ====
At 38 years old, Rosenberg became the youngest president in the Board's 264-year history. His election marks a significant shift for the organisation, which has traditionally been led by older members of the community. The median age of deputies in the Board is 65, with some members over 90.

Rosenberg's presidency is seen as part of a broader effort to encourage younger people to become involved in the organisation. He views his role as an opportunity to demonstrate that leadership in the Jewish community is not age-dependent but based on one's ability to contribute.

==== Vision and priorities ====
As President, Rosenberg has outlined several key priorities:

1. Fighting antisemitism
2. Standing up for peace and security for Israel and the Middle East
3. Defending religious freedoms
4. Making the Jewish community more united, inclusive and outward-looking
5. Celebrating the faith, heritage and culture of British Jews.

On his first day in office, he fulfilled his pledge to begin recruiting for a Campaigns Officer to scale up the Jewish community's advocacy efforts.

Early in his presidency, he continued his activism in interfaith relations by launching what he called the "Optimistic Alliance" between Jews and Muslims; he was active in the historic Drumlanrig Accords signed by UK Muslim and Jewish leaders, and presented to His Majesty King Charles III.

As he promised in his Manifesto, Rosenberg launched a Commission on Antisemitism, led by the Government's Independent Advisor on Antisemitism Lord John Mann and former Defence Secretary Penny Mordaunt. They reported on their findings in July 2025.

A particular early focus for him was the release of Israeli hostages held in Gaza. In September 2024 he spoke alongside the Prime Minister at an event in 10 Downing Street to call for the release of the hostages. The event was the Jewish community's first event in Downing Street following the election of the Keir Starmer government. Rosenberg also spoke at the anniversary event in Hyde Park commemorating the 7 October 2023 attacks in Southern Israel and spearheaded the creation of vigils outside the Scottish Parliament in addition to vigils in Westminster.

Noting the lack of gender diversity in the elected leadership team, Rosenberg spearheaded efforts to create a Gender Equality Plan within his first 100 days of office and worked with the Deputies to achieve the first gender-balanced Executive in the Board's 264-year history.

== Professional background ==
Outside of his communal roles, Rosenberg works as a consultant specialising in government relations, media, faith, and diplomacy. He is the founder of a consultancy called PR GR.

Rosenberg is known for his strong network of media, political, interfaith, and diplomatic contacts.

== Personal life ==
In 2019, Rosenberg married Frances Abebreseh in Jerusalem. He represents Brondesbury Park Synagogue as a deputy in the Board of Deputies.

== Additional roles and affiliations ==
In addition to his presidency at the Board of Deputies, Rosenberg holds the position of Vice President at the World Jewish Congress. This role further extends his influence and involvement in global Jewish affairs. He is a Vice President of the Jewish Leadership Council and a Trustee of the Holocaust Memorial Day Trust.

== Impact and reception ==
Rosenberg's election and leadership style have been well received by many in the Jewish community. Laura Marks, a former Board senior vice-president, praised his campaign as "brilliant" and expressed hope that he would inspire a new generation of young people to get involved in community leadership.

Richard Cohen, a veteran board member, described Rosenberg as a "consummate professional campaigner" and noted his appeal to various shades of the political spectrum due to his energy and enthusiasm.
