= Gilad Atzmon =

British jazz saxophonist, political activist, and writer (born 1963)

Gilad Atzmon גלעד עצמון
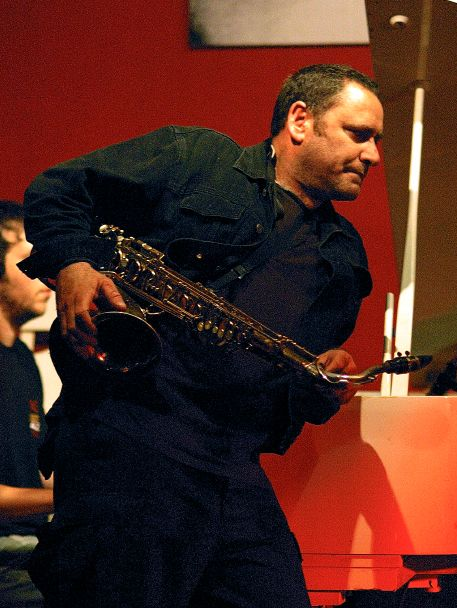
- Atzmon in concert, February 2007
- Born: Gilad Atzmon; 9 June 1963 (age 63); Ramat Gan, Tel Aviv, Israel
- Citizenship: British (since 2002); Israeli (until 2002)
- Education: Rubin Academy of Music; University of Essex
- Occupations: Musician; writer
- Children: 2
- Musical career
- Origin: Jerusalem
- Genres: Bebop; new wave
- Instruments: Accordion; clarinet; flute; saxophone; zurna
- Years active: 1987–present
- Labels: Acoustica; Domino; Enja; Fanfare; Face; Fruitbeard; MCI; WMD; World Village
- Writing career
- Years active: 2001–present
- Genres: Political philosophy; satire
- Subjects: Anti-Zionism; identity politics
- Website: gilad.online

Gilad Atzmon (Hebrew: גלעד עצמון, [ɡiˈlad at͡sˈmon]; born 9 June 1963) is an Israeli-born British saxophonist, novelist, political activist, and writer.

As a musician, he is best known as a saxophonist and bandleader. As a solo artist and with his bands, Atzmon has recorded around 20 albums. Since 1998, he has also been a member of the English rock band, the Blockheads. He has played on albums by Pink Floyd and Robert Wyatt.

Atzmon's writings and statements about Israel, the Holocaust, and the Jewish people have been described by scholars and anti-racism activists as antisemitic and promoting Holocaust denial.

== Early life ==
Atzmon was born in Tel Aviv, Israel, to a conservative secular Jewish family. He grew up in Jerusalem, where his father served in the military.

Atzmon first became interested in British jazz when he came across recordings of Ronnie Scott and Tubby Hayes. During his incapacitation for nearly a year following a climbing accident, Atzmon started playing the saxophone in earnest. Discovering bebop, he said that the albums Charlie Parker with Strings were what made him want to be a jazz musician.

Atzmon's three-year compulsory service in the Israel Defense Forces commenced in mid 1981; at first he served as a combat medic, including the early months of the 1982 Lebanon War, but most of his service was in the Israeli Air Force orchestra. Atzmon recounts that, after his demobilisation, he spent an autumn busking in Europe.

== Musical career ==
=== Early years ===
In the following years, he trained at the Rubin Academy of Music in Jerusalem. During the late 1980s and 1990s Atzmon was a popular session musician and producer, recording extensively and performing with artists such as Yardena Arazi, Meir Banai, Ofra Haza, Si Himan and Yehuda Poliker. He started the first incarnation of the "Gilad Atzmon Quartet" and a group named "Spiel Acid Jazz Band", and performed regularly at the Red Sea Jazz Festival.

In 1994, Atzmon, after initially planning to study in the United States, enrolled at the University of Essex, earning a master's degree in philosophy. Atzmon recounts that, soon after arriving in the UK, he secured a residency at the Black Lion in Kilburn and, after establishing a following playing bebop and post-bop, began touring Europe with his band. In 2002, he became a British citizen, and renounced his Israeli citizenship.

=== Instruments and style ===
Originally a tenor saxophone player, Atzmon's main instrument is the alto saxophone: he also plays the accordion, the soprano, tenor and baritone saxophones and the clarinet, flute, sol and zurna.

Atzmon's musical method has been to explore cultural identity, including tango and klezmer, as well as Arabic, Balkan, Gypsy and Ladino folk forms. Atzmon says Arabic music, like Indian music, cannot be notated like western music but must be internalised by "reverting to the primacy of the ear". His performances have been described as "quotes from jazz standards, torch songs, ideas playfully purloined from Mediterranean or Middle Eastern sources, sultry Paris-cabaret smooches, New Orleans clarinet swing and bebop in hyperdrive", and that "His source materials range from east-European folk music through to hard bop, funk and French accordion tunes". Atzmon's varies his recording style from that of his performances, saying "I don't think that anyone can sit in a house, at home, and listen to me play a full-on bebop solo. It's too intense. My albums need to be less manic."

=== Collaborations and groups ===
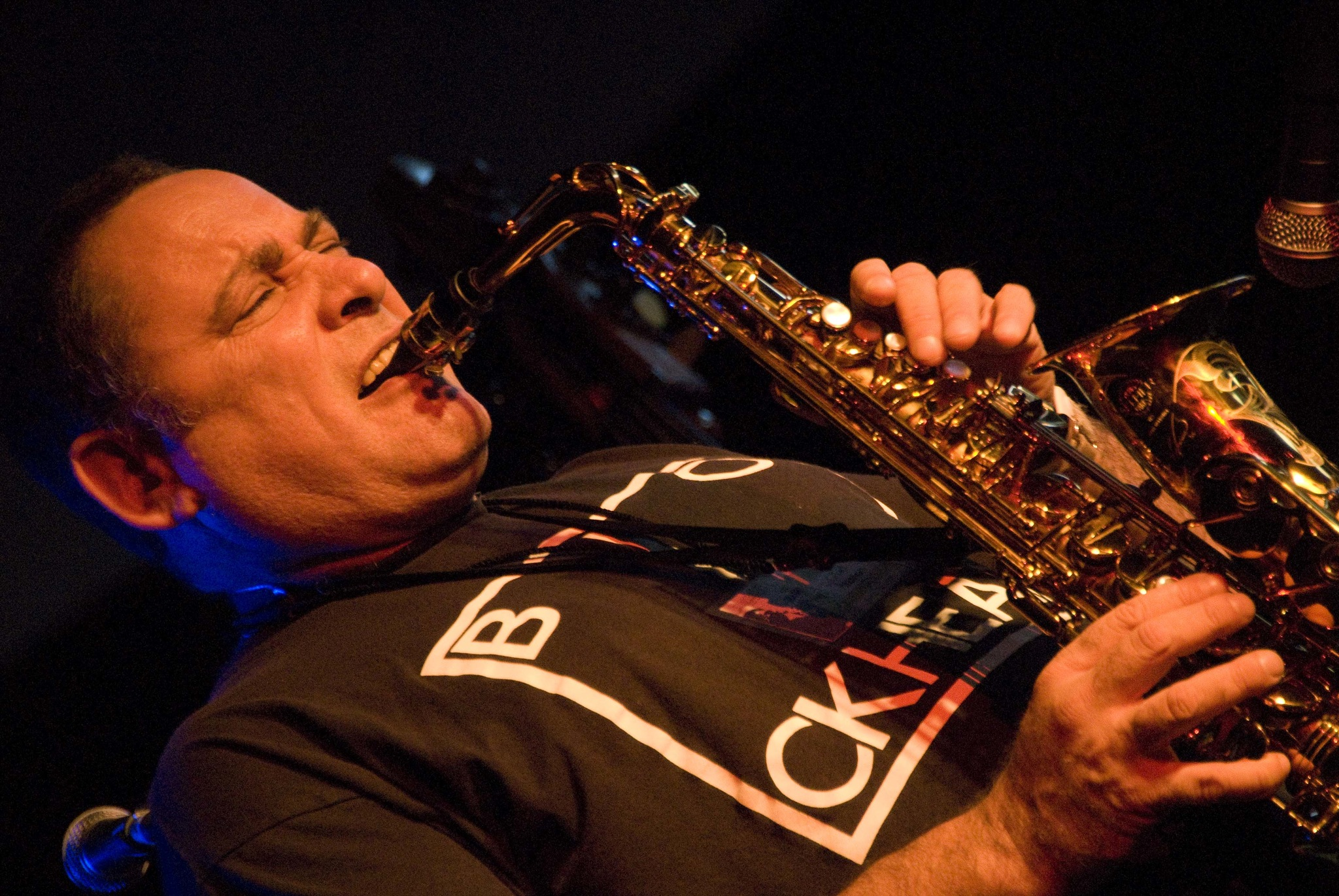
Atzmon playing with the Blockheads

In the early 2000s, Atzmon had at times played over 100 dates a year and recorded and performed with such artists as Ian Dury, Sir Paul McCartney, Sinéad O'Connor and Robbie Williams. He led a bebop quartet for over 20 years and, in 2000, founded the Orient House Ensemble, with Asaf Sirkis on drums, Frank Harrison on piano and Oli Hayhurst on bass. In 2003, Hayhurst was replaced by Yaron Stavi and, in 2009, Sirkis left to form his own trio. The Ensemble recorded nine albums and, in 2010, announced a 40-date anniversary tour. In 2017, the Ensemble collaborated with the Sigamos String Quartet to produce The Spirit of Trane, a tribute to John Coltrane. The Ensemble was named after Orient House, the former East Jerusalem headquarters of the Palestine Liberation Organization.

In 1998, Atzmon joined veteran punk rock band Ian Dury and the Blockheads, while sustaining other projects. He participated in Robert Wyatt's album, Comicopera (2007), and with Wyatt, Ros Stephens and lyricist Alfreda Benge, on For the Ghosts Within (2010). Atzmon produced and arranged two albums for Sarah Gillespie, Stalking Juliet (2009) and In The Current Climate (2011), and toured with her band, and has produced albums for Dutch-Iraqi jazz singer Elizabeth Simonian, afro-jazz percussionist and singer Adriano Adewale, and Blockheads bassist Norman Watt-Roy. In 2010, Atzmon released a musical transcription of ten saxophone solos.

In 2014, he performed on The Endless River, the final studio album of Pink Floyd and, in 2017, collaborated with Indonesian world and jazz pianist Dwiki Dharmawan and Middle Eastern oud star Kamal Musallam on World Peace Trio. Atzmon has been a member of the creative panel of the Global Music Foundation, which runs international musical education and performance events internationally.

=== Reviews and awards ===
==== Musical mastery ====
In 2003, Exile was BBC Jazz Album of the Year; John Fordham. reviewing it in The Guardian, concluded that Atzmon "would have a formidable international reputation as a soloist alone". The Guardian, reviewing MusiK (2004), called Atzmon "a dominant figure in European and Middle Eastern-influenced world-music" while Stuart Nicholson in The Observer said of it that "this remarkable man and his brilliantly conceived ensemble are now well and truly a world-class act". The BBC, reviewing In Loving Memory of America (2009), called Atzmon "One of the finest alto players around", while The Guardian, in reviewing The Whistle Blower (2015), called Atzmon "a gifted jazz musician to his core". John Lewis in The Guardian praised Atzmon as "one of London's finest saxophonists" although noting that "even his best albums have a slightly tame, homogenous feel that shares little with his blistering live performances". Lewis also said, "It is Atzmon's blunt anti-Zionism rather than his music that has given him an international profile, particularly in the Arab world, where his essays are widely read".

==== Activism-influenced music ====
The Birmingham Post wrote that, "overriding the considerable instrumental technique of all involved, it is the intense beliefs and emotions they summon up and communicate that make this band's music so special" referring to Atzmon's incorporation of political and activist quotes in the Ensemble's performances. The Manchester Evening News said of Refuge (2007), "The individuality of the music is extraordinary. No one is more willing to serve his music with raw political passion", while the BBC said "...the OHE is finding its voice in an increasingly subtle blend of East and West, that's brutal and beautiful".

Lewis described Atzmon's comedy klezmer project, Artie Fishel and the Promised Band (2006), as "a clumsy satire on what (Atzmon) regards as the artificial nature of Jewish identity politics" and felt that "trenchant politics often sit uneasily alongside music, particularly when that music is instrumental". The Telegraph said, "on the level of technical skill with alto and soprano saxes and clarinet, Atzmon is a real master" while describing Atzmon as "an angry man".

== Writings ==
=== Views ===
Atzmon has defined himself variously as "not a Jew anymore. I indeed despise the Jew in me (whatever is left)", a "proud self-hating Jew" (saying, "I celebrate my hatred towards everything I represent") in the style of Otto Weininger, "a Jew who hates Judaism", and as "a Hebrew-speaking Palestinian".

He has said: "I don't write about politics, I write about ethics. I write about Identity. I write a lot about the Jewish Question – because I was born in the Jew-land, and my whole process in maturing into an adult was involved with the realisation that my people are living on stolen land". Atzmon has compared "the Jewish Ideology" to that of the Nazis and has described Israel's policy toward the Palestinians as genocide. He has condemned "Jewishness" as "very much a supremacist, racist tendency", but has also stated that "I don't have anything against Jews in particular and you won't find that in my writings". Regarding the one-state solution, Atzmon concedes that such a state probably would be controlled by Islam, but says, "That's their business".

In 2012, Norton Mezvinsky wrote that "Gilad Atzmon is a critical and committed secular humanist with firm views, who delights in being provocative".

=== Periodicals ===
Atzmon has written for a number of publications, including CounterPunch, Dissident Voice and The Palestine Chronicle. In 2009, he wrote for and edited the website, Palestine Think Tank. According to John Lewis in The Guardian, "It is Atzmon's blunt anti-Zionism rather than his music that has given him an international profile, particularly in the Arab world, where his essays are widely read".

=== Books ===
Atzmon's first book, A Guide to the Perplexed, published in 2001, is a comic novel set in a future in which Israel has been replaced by a Palestinian state. Matthew J. Reisz for The Independent wrote that "As a viciously black satire on Israeli life" the book "is grandiose, childish and nasty, but with just enough connection with reality to give it a certain unsettling power" while Darren King in The Observer commented that "it works because Atzmon writes with so much style and his gags are so hilarious".

Atzmon's second novel, My One and Only Love, published in 2005, was described by the BBC as a "comedic narrative on Zionist espionage and intrigue" and a "psychological and political commentary on the personal conflict between being true to one's heart and being loyal to the Jews". By 2010, the two novels had been published in 27 languages.

His A to Zion: The Definitive Israeli Lexicon, published in 2015, is a satirical dictionary illustrated by cartoons from Enzo Apicella.

His Being in Time: A Post-Political Manifesto, was published in 2017. The title is a reference to Martin Heidegger, author of Being and Time. Keith Kahn-Harris argues that book features several antisemitic tropes and that its argument that problematic identity politics are derived from Jewish identity leads to antisemitic conclusions: "for Atzmon, Jewishness is the ultimate source of everything that divides and rules us". Kahn-Harris describes the book as "wrap[ping] crude bigotry within ostensibly elegant prose".

==== The Wandering Who? ====
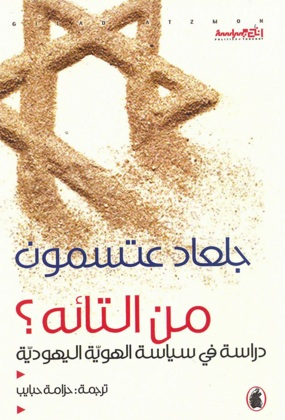
Cover of Arabic translation of The Wandering Who?

In 2011, Zero Books published Atzmon's third book, The Wandering Who? A Study of Jewish Identity Politics, stating that it "examines Jewish identity politics and Jewish contemporary ideology using both popular culture and scholarly texts". It was translated into Arabic by the Palestinian writer Huzama Habayeb. In the book, Atzmon describes himself as "proud to be a self-hating Jew", and says that his insights are based on the writings of Otto Weininger, who he characterises as "an anti-Semite who loathed almost anything that wasn't Aryan manhood." On the blood libel, the book argues that children should be allowed to ask their teachers "how do they know that the accusations that Jews used the blood of gentile children to bake matzot are indeed empty or groundless accusations." Other controversial passages in the book include the statement "Some brave people will say that Hitler was right after all."

Marc H. Ellis likened Atzmon's rhetorical extremism and harsh censure of Jews to the prophetic voices of the Old Testament, arguing that, for Atzmon, diasporic Jews are asked to construct their identity on the basis of the State of Israel and the Holocaust, an identity he regards as without foundation. He added that Atzmon considers charges that he is antisemitic as "last ditch attempts" to validate that identity. In Ellis's view, there may be, in the perceived anxiety in these repeated attacks, a reflection of the same anxiety Atzmon himself arguably embodies.

In The Atlantic, Jeffrey Goldberg described Atzmon as "jazz saxophonist who lives in London and who has a side gig disseminating the wildest sort of anti-Semitic conspiracy theories", and described several instances of Holocaust denial and antisemitic discourse by Atzmon including: describing the Holocaust as "the new Western religion", that Hitler was persecuted by Jews, and that Jews traffic in body parts. Goldberg notes that even Boycott, Divestment and Sanctions activists have repudiated him. According to Goldberg, Atzmon in the book calls for renewed scholarship into the veracity of long-rejected medieval blood libels.

According to Alan Dershowitz, while some prominent academics defended Atzmon and endorsed the book, describing it as "fascinating" and "absorbing and moving", several authors associated with the publisher called on it to distance itself from his views, asserting that "The thrust of Atzmon's work is to normalise and legitimise anti-Semitism".

== Allegations of antisemitism ==
=== Timeline ===
In 2003, Atzmon wrote that: "We must begin to take the accusation that the Jewish people are trying to control the world very seriously", the blog post was subsequently amended with "Zionists" replacing "the Jewish people" in the original post. Also in 2003, Atzmon wrote that attacks on synagogues and Jewish graves, while not legitimate, should be seen as "political responses".

In April 2005, Atzmon said in a talk with SOAS university students that "I'm not going to say whether it is right or not to burn down a synagogue, I can see that it is a rational act". Atzmon responded that he was quoted inaccurately and out of context and did not mean to justify violence, but that since Israel presents itself as the "state of the Jewish people" the "any form of anti-Jewish activity may be seen as political retaliation."

In a 2005 opinion piece, David Aaronovitch criticised Atzmon for his essay "On Anti-Semitism" and for circulating an article promoting Holocaust denial. In June, members of the Jews Against Zionism (JAZ) group protested in front of a London bookshop against an appearance by Atzmon who was criticised by JAZ for circulating a Paul Eisen work that defended Holocaust denier Ernst Zündel.

In a 2006 opinion piece, David Hirsh criticised what he called Atzmon's "openly anti-Jewish rhetoric", including Jewish deicide.

In 2011, David Landy, an Irish academic and former chair of the Ireland Palestine Solidarity Campaign, wrote that Atzmon's words, "if not actually anti-Semitic, certainly border on it". In The Guardian, socialist writer Andy Newman argued that Atzmon attributes the oppression of Palestinians to Jewish lobbies and Jewish power rather than to the state of Israel, citing a 2009 article "Tribal Marxism for Dummies" as an example of an antisemitic text: "a wild conspiracy argument, dripping with contempt for Jews".

In 2012, the US Palestinian Community Network published a statement by three members of its National Coordinating Committee and other Palestinian activists, including Ali Abunimah, Naseer Aruri, Omar Barghouti, Nadia Hijab and Joseph Massad, calling for "the disavowal of Atzmon by fellow Palestinian organizers, as well as Palestine solidarity activists, and allies of the Palestinian people" and affirming that "we regard any attempt to link and adopt antisemitic or racist language, even if it is within a self-described anti-imperialist and anti-Zionist politics, as reaffirming and legitimizing Zionism."

At a talk by Richard Falk at LSE in March 2017 at which pro-Israel protestors were expelled for disruption, Atzmon commented that Jews had been "expelled from Germany for misbehaving", and to have recommended the works of David Irving, whose Holocaust denial views are widely known. Atzmon subsequently confirmed that he indeed recommends Irving's work and that in his view "Jews are always expelled for a reason".

According to a joint report by Hope not Hate and Community Security Trust, in 2017 Atzmon gave a talk to the conspiracy theory group Keep Talking in which he advanced the argument that the Balfour Declaration transpired to "conceal a century of Jewish political hegemony in Britain".

In 2018, Islington Council stopped Atzmon from performing at the council-owned Islington Assembly Hall, as the council feared Atzmon's appearance could harm relationships between different races and religions.

=== Organisations ===
David Neiwert, writing in the Southern Poverty Law Center's Hatewatch, described Atzmon as "a self-described 'self-hating ex-Jew' whose writings and pronouncements are rich in conspiracy theories, Holocaust trivialization and distortion, and open support of anti-Israeli terrorist groups."

The Anti-Defamation League described Atzmon as "an outspoken promoter of classic anti-Semitic conspiracy theories and a fierce critic of the State of Israel (who) has engaged in Holocaust diminution and has defended the right of Holocaust deniers to challenge historical narratives and offer revisionist theories about the Holocaust.".

Hope not Hate described Atzmon as "an antisemite who has promoted the works of Holocaust deniers", relating the Holocaust denial support mainly to circulating a work of Paul Eisen. Atzmon has described Hope Not Hate as "an integral part of the Zionist network, dedicated to promoting Jewish tribal politics".

A spokesperson for the UK Labour Party called Atzmon a "vile antisemite" and voiced approval of Labour MP Chris Williamson's apology for promoting a petition in support of Atzmon.

In 2012, The US Palestinian Community Network and The Electronic Intifada published an open letter describing Atzmon as a conspiracy theorist and antisemite, and calling for allies of the Palestinian cause to disavow him. Among the letter's signatories were Naseer Aruri, Omar Barghouti, and Hatem Bazian.

=== Scholarship ===
According to David Hirsh, writing in 2017, Atzmon attempted to lead an antisemitic purge of the anti-Zionist movement, which however runs counter to the anti-racist values of most anti-Zionists. Despite this, it took some time for the Palestine Solidarity Campaign and Socialist Workers Party, which had collaborated closely with him since 2004, to stop treating Atzmon as legitimate.

Nicolas Terry, a historian of the Holocaust and of Holocaust revisionism at the University of Exeter, also writing in 2017, characterised Atzmon, along with Paul Eisen and Israel Shamir, as one of the very few Jewish Holocaust deniers who were associated with Deir Yassin Remembered. Terry notes that after the Palestine Solidarity Campaign expelled several Holocaust deniers, Atzmon rallied other sympathisers around the Deliberation website.

According to Spencer Sunshine, a researcher on the far-right writing in 2019, Atzmon along with Israel Shamir and Alison Weir forms an axis of crypto-antisemites who recycle traditional antisemitic conspiracy theories with the replacement of "the Jews" with a code word or synecdoche. Sunshine states that Atzmon denounces Judaism itself as the root issue in Zionism, with Atzmon framing Israeli atrocities as a "historic relationship to gentiles, an authentic expression of an essentially racist, immoral, and anti-human 'Jewish ideology.'". Sunshine notes that Atzmon's appearances on White nationalist media such as Counter Currents has not stopped Atzmon from being platformed in left-wing publications such as CounterPunch.

=== Responses ===
Atzmon has described charges of antisemitism as being a "common Zionist silencing apparatus" and said that "there is an international smear campaign against me".

According to Atzmon, his statements have lost him performance contracts, especially in the United States, while in Britain, the Campaign Against Antisemitism has sought to stop him performing.

In 2009, Atzmon said "I've got nothing against the Semite people, I don't have anything against people—I'm anti-Jewish, not anti-Jews".

== Socialist Workers Party ==
Atzmon performed at Socialist Workers Party (SWP) events for several years from 2004, and was promoted by the party as delivering "fearless tirades against Zionism", according to David Aaronovitch. Martin Smith defended Atzmon against Aaronovitch's allegations on behalf of the SWP. In 2006, arguing that, because Atzmon believed the text of The Protocols of the Elders of Zion, a hoax from the early 20th century, was a valid reflection of contemporary America, Oliver Kamm wrote in The Times that the SWP were "allying with classic anti-Semitism". Atzmon and the SWP were similarly accused by other writers. The party eventually severed their association with Atzmon.

== Libel case ==
In July 2018, Atzmon was forced to apologise to Gideon Falter, the chairman of the Campaign Against Antisemitism, and agreed to pay costs and damages, after being sued for libel. Atzmon had falsely alleged that Falter had profited from fabricating antisemitic incidents. Atzmon sought help from readers of his website to cover the remaining £40,000 of legal costs and damages.

== Personal life ==
Atzmon is married with two children and lives in London.

== Discography ==
- The Spirit of Trane (Fanfare Jazz, 2017)
- World Peace Trio (Enja, 2017)
- The Whistle Blower (Fanfare Jazz, 2014)
- Songs of the Metropolis (World Village, 2013)
- For the Ghosts Within with Robert Wyatt and Ros Stephen (Domino, 2010)
- The Tide Has Changed (World Village, 2010)
- In Loving Memory of America (Enja, 2009)
- Refuge (Enja, 2007)
- Artie Fishel and the Promised Band (WMD, 2006)
- MusiK with Robert Wyatt (Enja, 2004)
- Exile (Enja, 2004)
- Nostalgico (Enja, 2001)
- Gilad Atzmon & The Orient House Ensemble (Enja, 2000)
- Juizz Muzic (Fruitbeard, 1999)
- Take It or Leave It (Face Jazz, 1997)
- Spiel: Both Sides (MCI, 1995)
- Spiel Acid Jazz Band (MCI, 1995)
- Spiel (In Acoustic & H.M. Acoustica, 1993)

== Bibliography ==
- A Guide to the Perplexed (Serpent's Tail, 2002) ISBN 1-85242-826-0
- My One and Only Love (Saqi Books, 2005) ISBN 978-0-86356-507-6
- The Wandering Who?: A Study of Jewish Identity Politics (Zero Books, 2011) ISBN 978-1-84694-875-6
- A to Zion: The Definitive Israeli Lexicon (Fanfare Press, 2015) ISBN 978-0993183706
- Being in Time: A Post-Political Manifesto (Skyscraper Publications, 2017) ISBN 978-1911072201

== Filmography ==
- Gilad and All That Jazz (Contra Image, 2012)
