= London Forum (far-right group) =

Far-right coalition

- Founded: 2011
- Split from: New Right (UK)
- Ideology: Far-right

The London Forum is a loose organisation of far-right individuals based in London but with regional headquarters across the United Kingdom. Emerging in 2011 out of a split within the British far-right, meetings were regularly held by the organisation. These have been met with significant protests by anti-fascist activists and have been infiltrated by journalists, most notably a 2015 investigation of the group by The Mail on Sunday with the help of Searchlight, an anti-fascist magazine that focuses on the British far-right.

The group has brought together neo-Nazis, Holocaust deniers, antisemites, former British National Party and National Front activists and the founder of a proscribed terrorist organisation, National Action. Anti-fascist groups such as Hope not Hate have included the group in their research on British far-right politics. The group was described as white supremacist by Jonathan Arkush, the vice-president of the Board of Deputies of British Jews, in 2015. The London group has not met regularly since 2017, but regional branches of the organisation were still meeting as of 2018.

== History and ideology ==
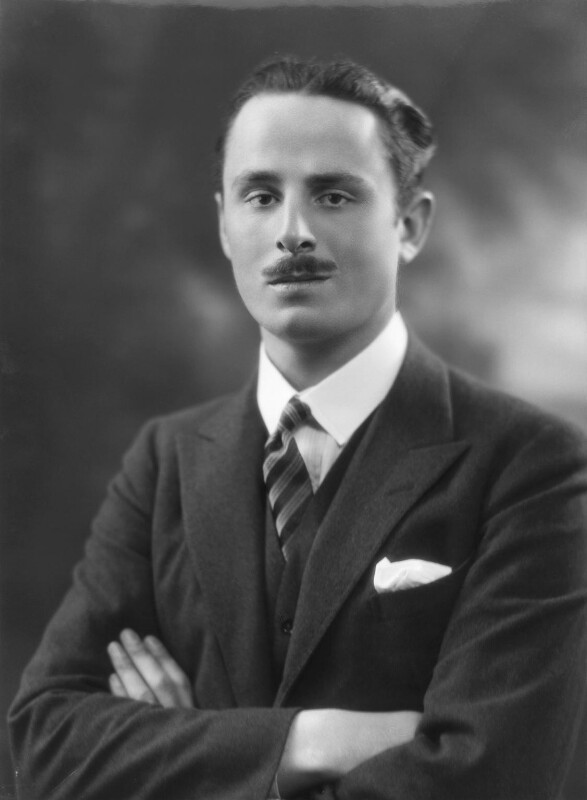
Oswald Mosley, the British fascist leader, has been praised by a figurehead of the group.

The London Forum emerged in 2011 as a split from the New Right, a series of far-right meetings in London that took place in the first decade of the 2000s. It describes itself as "the home of the UK alt-right". Searchlight, a magazine that focuses on the British far-right, says the group bridges "the fascist and Tory right". In 2015, the vice-president of the Board of Deputies of British Jews, Jonathan Arkush, described the group as white supremacist.

Stead Steadman – described as the organiser of the London Forum by Hope not Hate – told The Independent that while the group is not "credally defined", it opposes "globalism, cultural and non-cultural Marxism" and supports "white ethnicity and its civilisation, liberty of expression, and religious tradition". The group has told BBC News: "The London Forum comprises a range of people who care about their country and its demographic future and who wish to register their disagreement with the nigh ubiquitous enforced agenda of multiracialism and multiculturalism that threatens to destroy our identity irreversibly." Hope not Hate says the group's "ideological fluidity" allows the hosting of "speakers from across the British and international far-right. Because of this, it has links to almost every active far-right organisation in the UK, as well as many across Europe and North America". The group's events have brought together neo-Nazis, Holocaust deniers, alt-right students, anti-Semitic conspiracy theorists and former British National Party activists. The group says "Zionism, the role of Israel in international affairs and the influence of the Jewish Diaspora upon culture and politics" are "legitimate subjects for discussion".

Vice UK has described the group as "one of the organising hubs" for the far-right in Britain today. Jeremy Bedford Turner (a self-described fascist also known by the nickname Jez) is described by Hope not Hate as one of its leading figureheads. He is also a member of the Friends of Oswald Mosley group. Regarding the organisation, he said that the far-right "aimed for the soccer hooligans, for elements who weren't really into intellectual thinking. I realised this was a mistake ... There was a definite need for a leadership cadre, for a new intelligentsia, for a new mass media". In July 2015, Turner made an anti-Semitic speech featuring blood libel accusations against Jews. This was reported to the police by the Community Security Trust (CST) advocacy group. Following a judicial review brought to the Crown Prosecution Service (CPS) from the Campaign Against Antisemitism, Turner was arrested in May 2018 for incitement to racial hatred.

In February 2017, Hope not Hate said in a report that the London Forum was expanding rapidly and helping the alt-right to become globalised. However, following a year-long exposé on the far-right by researcher Patrik Hermansson and legal difficulties faced by the group later that year, the London branch did not hold events since May 2017, although regional branches have continued.

== Prominent speakers and events ==
=== Speakers ===
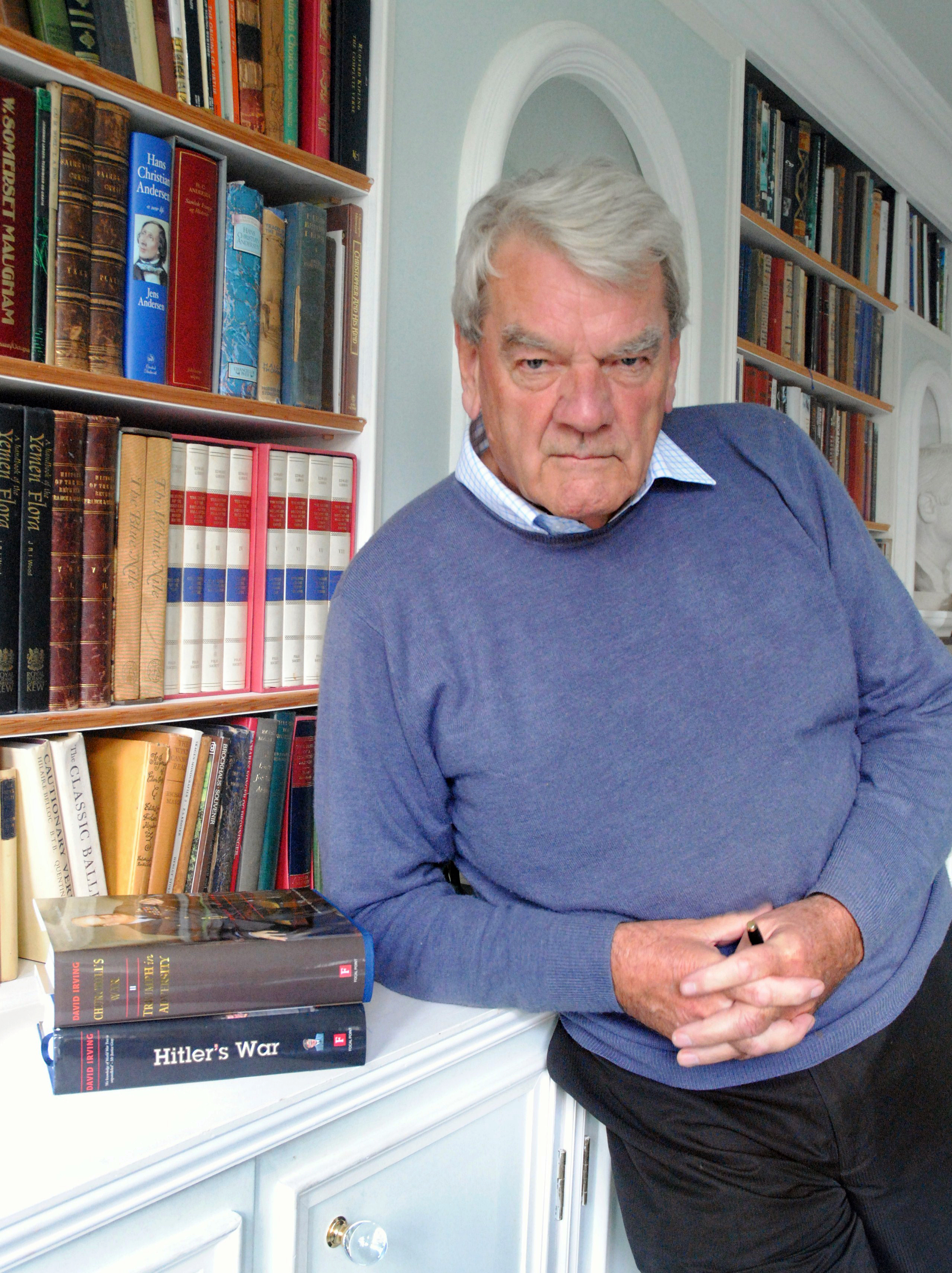
The Holocaust denier David Irving has addressed the group.

Prominent speakers at the group's meetings have included Holocaust deniers Pedro Varela Geiss, Mark Weber and David Irving; National Front activist Richard Edmonds; founder of proscribed terrorist organisation National Action, Alex Davies and Jason Jorjani from Arktos Media and Ian Millard, a barrister who was barred from practising after expressing his admiration for Adolf Hitler.

Former parliamentary candidate for the UK Independence Party (UKIP), Jack Sen, spoke at the London Forum in 2015. He was previously suspended from UKIP after sending an anti-Semitic tweet to Liverpool Wavertree Labour candidate Luciana Berger and describes himself as a National Socialist, according to The Mirror. American segregationist Matthew Heimbach addressed the organisation via video link in 2018 as he had been previously denied entry to the UK by then-Home Secretary Theresa May after making what The Guardian described as "neo-Nazi and antisemitic remarks".

YouTube personality Colin Robertson (Millennial Woes) gave a film talk on Withnail and I at a group meeting, arguing that the film is a politically incorrect statement against modern cultural degeneracy. His analysis was described by James Poulter in Vice UK as a far-right analogue to the Marxist and Hegelian film analyses of Slovenian philosopher Slavoj Žižek.

At a meeting of the group, Finnish nationalist Kai Murros called for a violent fascist revolution that would involve brigades of masked blackshirts "storming universities and dragging academics out into the streets", according to Vice UK. American white nationalist Greg Johnson called the London Forum "the most important organisation in the British nationalist scene after the collapse of the British National Party and the subsequent wave of party fatigue".

=== 2015 meeting ===
The logo of the BUF was worn on the lapel of an attendee.

With the help of Searchlight, the 2015 meeting by the group at the Grosvenor Hotel, Victoria was infiltrated by The Mail on Sunday reporters. Searchlight editor and publisher Gerry Gable said the event was "the biggest and most significant meeting of Holocaust deniers that Britain has ever seen". According to the newspaper's report, participants in the gathering were not told its exact location; they met at the nearby railway station and were escorted individually and in pairs to the hotel by former private school art teacher Michael Woodbridge, who was carrying a book by the former leader of the British Union of Fascists, Oswald Mosley, and wore a lapel pin with the BUF logo.

The Mail on Sunday described members as laughing at the mention of "ashes rising from the death camps' crematoria"; applauding a speaker who talked of destroying "Jewish-Zionist domination"; and mocking the Charlie Hebdo massacre, describing an African leader at a ceremony to commemorate the event as "some Negro" and cheering at the mention of a brigade of Spanish Nazi-aligned fascists. According to the same report, the headline speaker at the event was Spanish neo-Nazi Pedro Varela, who reportedly referred to children of mixed-race parentage as "blackos" and described same-sex parents as "making a monster family".

== See also ==
- Conservative Monday Club
- Eldon League
- Western Goals Institute
- Traditional Britain Group
- Keep Talking (group)
