= Stuart Waiton =

Scottish university lecturer

Stuart Waiton is a senior sociology and criminology lecturer at Abertay University. He teaches on matters relating to anti-social behaviour, moral panics, hate crimes, and politics. Ewan Gurr of the Evening Telegraph describes Waiton's political background as "on the far left of the political spectrum and rooted firmly within the revolutionary communist tradition". Waiton described himself as involved in anti-racist campaigns in the 1980s and 1990s as a member of Workers Against Racism, an anti-racist group associated with the British Revolutionary Communist Party.

In 2019 he joined the Brexit Party and was chosen as a candidate to be an MEP in Scotland. He was unsuccessful and later stood as for the party for Dundee West.

Waiton has been a columnist for the Times Educational Supplement (Scotland) and has written for The Times, The Independent, Living Marxism and its successor Spiked, and is currently a columnist for the Glasgow Herald and a contributor to a number of mainstream radio and television discussion programmes. He has appeared on Sky News and has been a contributor for the media outlet The Richie Allen Show.

He has described himself as pro-immigration, but argued that current policies needed to be changed, saying: "It's not helpful whenever someone tries to have a discussion about immigration and the racist card is thrown at them. We need to grow the economy. Immigration is pushing wages down." He has been involved in campaigns against the Offensive Behaviour at Football Act and is anti-environmentalist, saying that "the green agenda means no flying, no jobs, no growth".

He has criticised academics for allegedly stifling the debate around transgender topics, and has in turn been criticised for describing the transgender rights movement as asking for something that is biologically impossible. He has also questioned the state support for gender-neutral toilets and school uniforms and described the dynamic of equality campaigners as potentially authoritarian. He is also critical of lockdowns put in place by the Scottish government as a result of the COVID-19 pandemic, saying: "The 'Stay at Home, Protect the NHS' mantra encouraged people with the virus to be stuffed into homes and that has probably helped to kill some of those people rather than encouraging a more flexible approach." His claims were criticised by Dundee City Council leader John Alexander and the Scottish government.

In October 2025 he invited the group JIMS (Justice for Innocent Men Scotland) to lecture to university students. This talk was not authorised by the University and prompted an investigation into the matter. JIMS have previously targeted victims of sexual abuse online. Responses varied, with graffiti appearing on the University campus and nearby High School of Dundee buildings visible targeting Waiton, with students criticising the University; “JIMS were permitted to lecture their views as facts to university students – that is not exposure to controversial views, but the outright teachings of controversial views. Students have been restricted in their freedom for what they can and cannot express, they were not allowed to even question JIMS.” They would organise a student-led protest.

== Bibliography ==
- Scared of the kids?: Curfews, crime and the regulation of young people. Sheffield Hallam University Press. 2001. ISBN 978-0863399299.
- The Politics of Antisocial Behaviour Amoral Panics. Routledge Advances in Criminology. 2007. ISBN 978-0415872720.
- Waiton, Stuart (2012). Snobs' law: criminalising football fans in an age of intolerance (Take A Liberty ed.). Scotland. ISBN 978-0957155909.
