= Vivian Wineman =

British lawyer and Jewish community leader

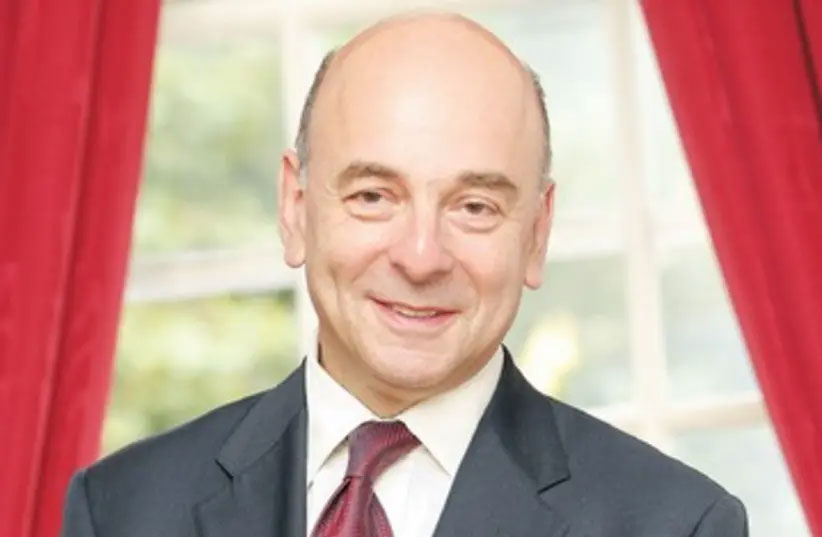
- Born: February 14, 1950; London, England
- Occupations: Lawyer; communal leader
- Known for: President of the Board of Deputies of British Jews (2009–2015)
- Spouse: Naomi Helen Greenberg
- Children: 3

Vivian Wineman (born 14 February 1950) was president of the Board of Deputies of British Jews, the representative body of the Jewish community in Britain, from 2009 to 2015.

== Early life ==
He was born in London, on 14 February 1950, to Joseph and Devorah Wineman.

== Career ==
Wineman has worked as a commercial lawyer in private practice specialising in insolvency work.

He was elected president of the Board of Deputies on 17 May 2009, and took office on 1 June, after an election which for the first time in the Board's 250-year history involved four candidates.

Prior to that he was the senior vice-president. In addition, he is chairman of the Membership Council of the Jewish Leadership Council. On 7 November 2013, he was elected chairman of the Council of the European Jewish Congress, the representative body of European Jewry, and in March 2013 he was elected vice-president of the World Jewish Congress.

He has shown a particular interest in inter-faith work. In July 2007 he became vice-chair of the Inter Faith Network for the UK, the umbrella body for inter faith organisations and national faith bodies working in the UK and on 1 July 2013 he was elected co-chair. Previously he was joint chair of Peace Now and chair of the New Israel Fund of Great Britain.

Vivian Wineman is currently the trustee of the following registered charities in the United Kingdom: Wineman Charitable Trust, The Rofeh Trust, The Council of Christians and Jews, The Institute for Polish-Jewish Studies, Wikimedia UK, United Religions Initiative UK, and The Next Century Foundation.

== Personal life ==
Wineman lives in London, is married to Naomi Helen Greenberg and has three children.
