= Israel Finestein =

English barrister (1921–2009)

Israel Finestein QC MA (1921–2009), an English barrister and Deputy High Court Judge, was a leader and historian of British Jewry. His writings analysed the history of divisions amongst the Jews of England; in varied roles he worked for communal change and reconciliation.

== Early life ==
Israel "Shmuel" Finestein was the youngest of nine children of a Kingston upon Hull Jewish tailor, who had emigrated from Chervyen (near Minsk) around 1905. He grew up speaking Yiddish as well as English. After Kingston High School, a Hull grammar school, at Trinity College Cambridge in 1943 he achieved Double 1st in History under G.M.Trevelyan.

== Professional career ==
Finestein laboured in Churchill's war history team, then studied law, and in 1946 joined the chambers of Quintin Hogg, later Lord Hailsham, Lord Chancellor; specialising in family law, he was called to the Bar in 1953. He became a QC in 1970, County, Crown, and then deputy High Court Judge in the family division.

Among his many posts were Chairman of England's Mental Health Review Tribunal.

== Historical work ==
As an amateur but scholarly historian, he interpreted and reassessed Anglo-Jewry in the Victorian and Edwardian period. His works cover the Emancipation of British Jews, key figures like Sir Moses Montefiore, Jewish education, and also recent leadership of the community.

He was twice President of the Jewish Historical Society of England, 1973-5.

== Community leadership ==
Finestein studied and worked with the central institutions of British Jewry established in Victorian times; he was a member of Council of the United Synagogue, as well as the Council of Christians and Jews. After many years of service he became President of the Board of Deputies of British Jews 1991-94, with international roles including vice president of The World Jewish Congress. At the Board of Deputies he "used his presidency to institute reforms of its organisation and constitution while enhancing, through the force of his own personality, its gravitas and public status."

== Charitable work ==
Finestein's interest in Jewish education brought him to be a charity trustee of The Jew's Free School, Jew's College and British ORT. Having been president of the Cambridge University Jewish Society and chairman of the Universities Zionist Council and the Inter University Jewish Federation, he was one of the founders in 1953 of the Hillel Foundation which supports Jewish students. As President of the Norwood learning disability and family charity he reviewed the history of its Royal patronage for HM Queen at the Guildhall.

He was also a Trustee of Jewish Care, and Chair of the Jewish Museum 1989-92. He supported David Kessler and the Kessler Foundation in reviewing the history of the Jewish Chronicle.

== Personal life ==
Israel Finestein was predeceased by his wife of almost 60 years Marion née Oster, leaving no children. Two of Shmuel's Hull-born nephews also became judges — John Finestein and Colin Lang.

Israel Finestein was the most important communal leader to emerge from the Jews of Kingston-upon-Hull. His long-researched "home town" essay on the Jews of Hull is definitive; Hull was the only local community about which he wrote. He received an honorary doctorate of laws from the University of Hull.
