= Keep Talking (group) =

Conspiracy theory and Holocaust denial group

Keep Talking is a conspiracy theory discussion group in the United Kingdom. Topics of its speakers have included the supposed faking of 9/11 and the 7/7 London terror attacks, the alleged hidden agendas behind assassinations of public figures and "secret" agendas of the Brexit negotiations. Researchers Dave Rich of the Community Security Trust and Joe Mulhall of Hope not Hate, after a three-year investigation into the group (which included attending and secretly recording meetings), reported that meetings often discussed alleged Jewish conspiracies, including Holocaust denial. Rich and Mulhall also reported that regular attendees included far-right activists, at least one former Labour Party member, and unspecified far-left activists.

== Formation ==
The group was founded prior to 2010 by Nicholas Kollerstrom, who has promoted Holocaust denial and other conspiracy theories, and Ian Fantom, who explained that his motivation for launching the group was that previous 9/11 Truth movement groups had been "sabotaged from within".

== Topics and speakers ==
The group holds monthly meetings in central London. Speakers' topics have included 9/11 conspiracy theories, whether the London terror attacks have been false flag operations, assassinations and EU/ Brexit. Speakers have included Gilad Atzmon, who told the group that the Balfour Declaration was meant to "conceal a century of Jewish political hegemony in Britain"; conspiracy theorist Vanessa Beeley, on the funding of the Syrian opposition; Peter Gregson on freedom of speech on Israel and antisemitism (Gregson was expelled from the GMB trade union for making comments about Israel deemed to be antisemitic.); Miko Peled on Palestine; and Piers Corbyn, who rejects the consensus on climate change and considers vaccines dangerous and COVID-19 a "hoax", on "global cooling".

== Attendees ==
Several of those who have been regular attendees are far-right activists. Stead Steadman, an organizer of the far-right group London Forum, has for periods regularly videotaped the meetings. Others include Alison Chabloz, convicted in 2019 for singing 'offensive' Holocaust-denial songs on social media, and James Thring, who has appeared on the radio show of former Ku Klux Klan leader David Duke. According to an investigative report of the group by researchers Rich and Mulhall, Gregson was "ridiculed" for saying in his speech that the Holocaust had happened and Thring maintained it had not and there were no deaths at the Auschwitz concentration camp. Former Labour Party member, Elleanne Green, founder of the Palestine Live Facebook group which featured Holocaust denial and 9/11 conspiracy theories, was also a regular attendee, while Gill Kaffash, a Holocaust denier and former Palestine Solidarity Campaign activist, was present at Gregson's talk.

== Responses ==
In 2018, a series of six events the group was planning at Conway Hall in London were cancelled after it was revealed that Kollerstrom would speak at the events. In 2019, St Anne's Church, Soho apologized for allowing the group to have a meeting at its premises.

In March 2019, Gregson's recommendation of an article by Fantom and defence of Kollerstrom on the grounds of free speech caused a rift within Labour Against the Witchhunt, leading to the banning of Gregson from its Facebook page by its vice-chair, Tony Greenstein.
