= The People's Voice (internet TV station) =

- London; England

Programming
- Language: English

History
- First air date: 25 November 2013
- Last air date: Mid-2014

The People’s Voice was a free global internet television and radio station which broadcast from 25 November 2013 until mid-2014. The station's main studio was in Wembley, London, with representatives in the United States. It was created with a crowdsourcing campaign on the fund-raising platform indiegogo. Its main creator was David Icke.

Presenters included Mark Windows, Richie Allen, Sonia Poulton and Kenneth O'Keefe. Guests of the first show included Cynthia McKinney, Norman Finkelstein, Peter Tatchell, Jim Marrs, Gerald Celente, Richard C. Hoagland, Vandana Shiva, Leuren Moret and Leah Bolger. Poulton left in early January 2014, following a dispute concerning the transparency of the channel's finances.

In March 2014, David Icke left TPV to concentrate on other work, having committed full-time to the station as an unpaid volunteer since its launch in November 2013. From March 2014, due to financial difficulties, it is believed that the station operated with a skeleton crew and had effectively ceased production of live programmes, running repeats of previous programmes instead. Despite a brief revival of one of its principal programmes, The Richie Allen Show, TPV ceased broadcasting completely in mid-2014 and became insolvent.

In August 2014, it was announced via the official website that TPV would return in October of the same year, dubbed The People's Voice 2.0. However, the station was never revived, and no further information was announced regarding its return.

In 2019, David Icke alongside sons Gareth and Jaymie launched the online streaming service 'Ickonic'.

== See also ==
- The People's Voice (website), a fake news website currently hosted at the domain thepeoplesvoice.tv
