= Mill Hill United Synagogue =

Orthodox synagogue in England

Coordinates: 51.61325°N 0.24795°W

Mill Hill United Synagogue is an Orthodox synagogue in Mill Hill in the London Borough of Barnet. Its rabbi is Yitzchak Schochet.

The congregation was founded in 1949 and its current synagogue building is at Station Road, Mill Hill, London NW7 2JU.
