= Biographical Encyclopedia of Astronomers =

Two-volume biographical dictionary

- Author: Edited by Thomas Hockey, Virginia Trimble, Thomas R. Williams, Katherine Bracher, Richard A. Jarrell, Jordan D. Marché, JoAnn Palmeri, Daniel W. E. Green
- Language: English
- Subject: Astronomy, History of Science
- Genre: Reference work
- Publisher: Springer
- Publication date: 2014
- Publication place: United States
- ISBN: 978-1-4419-9917-7
- Website: Biographical Encyclopedia of Astronomers
- Includes approximately 1850 biographical sketches on astronomers from antiquity to modern times.

The Biographical Encyclopedia of Astronomers (BEA) is a two-volume biographical dictionary, first published in 2007, with a second edition released in 2014. The work covers astronomers from all regions, born anytime between antiquity and mid-1918. It includes more than 1500 biographies of both well-known and more obscure astronomers, produced by 410 contributors. The encyclopedia has been published in both a print and online format by the publisher, Springer.

== Editions ==
- Hockey, Thomas A.; Virginia Trimble; Thomas R. Williams; Katherine Bracher, eds. (2007). Biographical Encyclopedia of Astronomers. New York: Springer. Bibcode:2007bea..book.....H. doi:10.1007/978-0-387-30400-7. ISBN 9780387310220. Biographical Encyclopedia of Astronomers at Google Books
