= Board of Deputies of British Jews =

British Jewish organisation

- Founded: 1760; 266 years ago
- Registration no.: 222160
- Legal status: Active
- Headquarters: London, England
- Region served: Great Britain and Northern Ireland
- Members: over 300
- President: Phil Rosenberg
- Chief Executive: Michael Wegier
- Budget: £1.7 million
- Website: bod.org.uk

The Board of Deputies of British Jews, commonly referred to as the Board of Deputies, is the largest and second oldest Jewish communal organisation in the United Kingdom, after the Initiation Society which was founded in 1745. Established in 1760 by a group of Sephardic Jews, the board presents itself as a forum for the views of most organisations within the British Jewish community, liaising with the British government on that basis. Notably, while Lord Rothschild was President of the Board of Deputies, the Balfour Declaration was addressed to him and eventually led to the creation of a Jewish state in Palestine. It is affiliated to the World Jewish Congress and the European Jewish Congress. The current president is Phil Rosenberg.

== History ==
The Board of Deputies of British Jews was established in London in 1760. Seven deputies were appointed by the elders of the Sephardi congregation of Spanish and Portuguese Jews to form a standing committee (Portuguese: deputados) founded to pay homage to George III on his accession to the throne. The Ashkenazi Jewish congregation then followed suit, establishing a public affairs committee to address urgent political matters and safeguard the interests of British Jews in the British Isles and the colonies. The two bodies began to meet and united in the 1810s. The joint organisation was named the London Committee of Deputies of British Jews.

In the mid-19th century, the organisation was headed by Sir Moses Montefiore, the Sephardi lay leader of British Jewry, and Nathan Adler, the Ashkenazi Chief Rabbi. The current name was adopted in 1913. In the course of its history, some of the major disputes were between Sephardi and Ashkenazi leaders and between religious and lay leaders.

The Board became more prominent in British society in the early twentieth century due to its support of refugees, notably leading an ultimately failed campaign against the Aliens Act 1905. However, by the 1930s, the Board's position had shifted to a more assimilationist position in order to improve the perception of Jews among the non-Jewish British population, including adopting a position of non-Zionism. In 1933, Neville Laski was elected as the board's president, and called for Jews to give "overriding consideration of duty and loyalty" to the United Kingdom. However, the stances of the Board once again had shifted in 1939 with the election as President of Selig Brodetsky, who was described by the Jewish Telegraphic Agency as the "foremost Zionist in Great Britain". As of 2024 the Board has continued to hold a Zionist position.

== Members and organisation ==
The Board is currently led by Phil Rosenberg - elected in 2024. The chief executive is Michael Wegier, the former chief executive of the UJIA. He succeeded Gillian Merron, who represented Labour as Member of Parliament (MP) for Lincoln from 1997 to 2010. From 2009 to 2010, she was Minister of State with responsibility for Public Health at the Department of Health. In 2020, she left her position at the Board when she was appointed a life peer, representing the Labour Party in the House of Lords. Michael Wegier leads a team of professional staff including Director of Public Affairs, Daniel Sugarman (formerly a journalist at The Jewish Chronicle).

Its membership comprises deputies elected by affiliated individual synagogues, confederations of synagogues, and other organisations within the Jewish community such as charities and youth groups. Most Haredi synagogues have chosen not to affiliate, although in 2021 the Board received its first Haredi deputy since the 1970s, from a synagogue in Stamford Hill. In 2012, it was noted that nearly two-thirds of the deputies were over 60 years of age. However, in the 21st century, the organisation has seen an influx of younger deputies, including two vice-presidents in their early thirties and Phil Rosenberg, who at the age of 38 was elected to succeed Marie van der Zyl as president from 1 June 2024.

It serves as the principal reference point for government, the media and wider society. All matters tending to impact on the life of Jews in Britain fall within the Board's remit, including an active interfaith programme. It is the British affiliate of the World Jewish Congress, the world-wide umbrella organisation of Jewish communities and is the UK member of the European Jewish Congress. Its offices are co-located with the United Jewish Israel Appeal in Kentish Town.

In January 2019, the Jewish Leadership Council reiterated its call for a "unified communal structure" with the Board of Deputies. A previous merger proposal was rejected in 2015 after deputies felt that they would be relegated to second-rate status. In response to the later call, Marie van der Zyl said that "the representative body that speaks for the community must have the legitimacy and accountability that comes from being broad based, democratic and elected." Deputies have in the past noted that, while board honorary officers are accountable to deputies, who themselves are accountable to their constituencies, the Jewish Leadership Council had no such governance structure. However, in March 2020, van de Zyl called in The Jewish Chronicle for "a more permanent unity" between the organisations.

== Mission ==
The issues which the board states it addresses are:

- Antisemitism and extremism
- Israel and the Middle East
- Education
- Religious freedoms and inequalities
- Interfaith and social action
- International advocacy

== Jewish Culture Month ==
In 2026, the Board of Deputies launched the United Kingdom's first nationwide Jewish Culture Month, a month-long cultural festival running from 16 May to 15 June. The initiative featured more than 150 cultural events across the UK, with participation from institutions including the V&A Museum, the British Library, JW3, and the National Holocaust Museum.

== Controversies ==
In the 1936 Battle of Cable Street the Board of Deputies decided to oppose, rather than support, the counter demonstration against the British Union of Fascists.

In 2003, the Board, on its website, reproduced an extract from a US State Department report that suggested that the aid organisation Palestinian Relief and Development Fund (Interpal) was helping to fund terrorist organisations. Interpal threatened to sue for libel, whereupon the Board retracted and apologised for its comments.

In the same year the Jewish Leadership Council, which says it "brings together the major British Jewish organisations to work for the good of the British Jewish community", was founded.

In 2005, after the Mayor of London, Ken Livingstone, compared a Jewish Evening Standard reporter, Oliver Finegold, to a concentration camp guard, the Board, along with the Commission for Racial Equality, filed an ultimately unsuccessful complaint to the Standards Board for England, calling on Livingstone to apologise. Livingstone responded by stating "there is no law against 'unnecessary insensitivity' or even 'offensiveness' to journalists harassing you as you try to go home" and that he had a "25-year running battle" with the paper's owners.

In 2014, at the height of the Israeli military operation in Gaza, the Board issued a joint statement with the Muslim Council of Britain (MCB) condemning antisemitism and Islamophobia. The statement with its slogan 'to export peace rather than import conflict' proved controversial among some on the conservative wing of the Jewish community but was supported by others on the progressive wing and by groups in inter faith circles. The principle of such a statement was approved by a majority of over 75% at a meeting of the Board on 21 September 2014. In December 2015, the new leadership of the Board distanced itself from the MCB over the latter's alleged links to the Islamist Muslim Brotherhood.

In 2018, over five hundred British Jews signed a letter from Yachad saying that the Board had "deeply misrepresented" their views after the board criticised Hamas for "repeated violent attempts at mass invasion" but did not call for Israeli restraint or acknowledge that the IDF may have acted disproportionately in massacring Palestinians at the Great March of Return. Liberal Judaism said that "the Board's credibility as the voice of British Jewry depends wholly on its willingness to listen to, hear from and reflect the values of all sections of the community".

In July 2018, the Board suspended Roslyn Pine, deputy for Finchley United Synagogue, for six years, following comments she made which were described as Islamophobic, and for admitting to holding anti-Arab views.

Writing in The Jewish Chronicle in November 2018 about antisemitism in the Labour Party, Marie van der Zyl said, "Over the summer, we showed how we could keep this issue of antisemitism on the front pages day after day, week after week, exacting a severe political and reputational cost for continued failure." In 2019, following Jeremy Corbyn's decision to resign as leader of the Labour Party, the Board asked candidates for the leadership to sign up to ten pledges in order to "end the antisemitism crisis". The pledges included a resolution of outstanding disciplinary cases, lifetime membership bans for some individuals, an independent disciplinary process, full and unconditional adoption of the International Holocaust Remembrance Alliance (IHRA) Working Definition of Antisemitism, and engagement with the mainstream Jewish community. Most of the candidates for leader or deputy leader signed up unconditionally.

In 2020, the Board clashed with the new Israeli ambassador to the UK, Tzipi Hotovely, and some members of the community over the Board's continued commitment to Palestinian statehood as part of a two-state solution to the Israel/Palestine conflict.

In 2026, the Green Party of England and Wales Conference passed a motion defining Zionism as an ideology supporting "an ethnonationalist Jewish state in historic Palestine to the exclusion and/ or domination of the non-Jewish population", and therefore a racist ideology. In response, the Board of Deputies stated that the Green Party of England and Wales had, "by adopting an antisemitic platform, become a racist party". A spokesman for the Greens insisted the party rejected the Board of Deputies' "characterisation of this motion and our party" and that the decision "will not stop us from speaking out against the genocide in Gaza and pushing for stronger sanctions against the Israeli government and its leaders".

== Scotland ==
After Scottish devolution in 1999, the Scottish Council of Jewish Communities was formed to give the Jewish Community of Scotland a single democratically accountable voice in dealings with the Scottish Parliament and Executive, other communities, and other statutory and official bodies. The intention when it was established was for it to stand in the same relationship to the Scottish Government as the Board of Deputies of British Jews does to the UK Government. Consequently, the council is autonomous in matters devolved by the Scotland Act, such as justice, health and welfare, and community relations, whilst the Board of Deputies speaks for all Britain's Jews on reserved matters such as foreign affairs and equality legislation.

== List of presidents ==
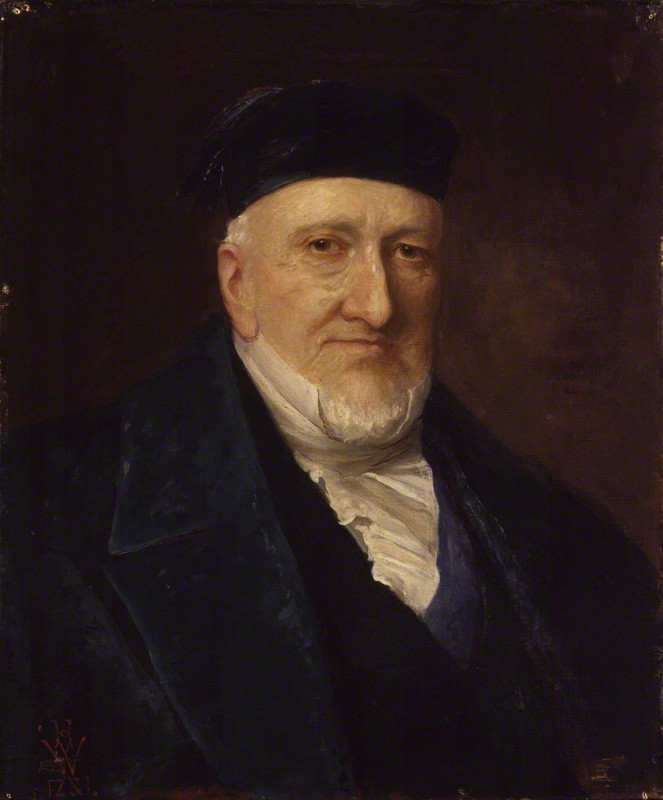
Moses Montefiore and his family members dominated the presidency of the Board during the 19th century. Sephardic Jews were prominent early on.

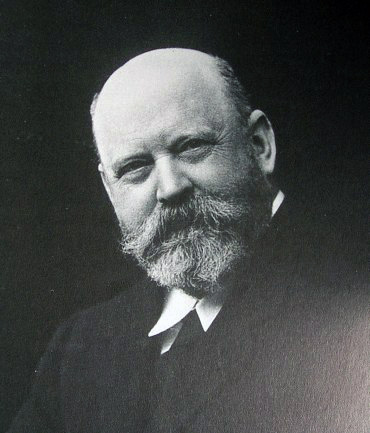
Walter Rothschild was president of the Board during the early 20th century. The Balfour Declaration was addressed to him.

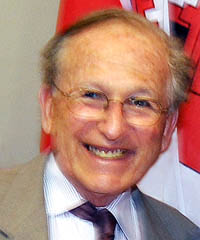
Greville Janner was president of the Board during the late 20th century. He was also an MP, a member of the House of Lords and a leader of other Jewish organisations.

The most historically notable and longest-serving past president was the Victorian-era banker Moses Montefiore, who in the 19th century travelled widely to assist Jewish communities in foreign countries, faced by persecution at the time. A complete list of presidents and interim positions is as follows:

18th century

- Benjamin Mendes Da Costa (1760)
- Joseph Salvador (1766)
- Joseph Salvador (1778)
- Moses Isaac Levy (1789)

19th century

- Naphtaly Bazevy (1801)
- No record (1802–1812)
- Raphael Brandon (1812)
- Moses Lindo (1817–1829)
- Moses Mocatta (1829–1835)
- Sir Moses Montefiore (1835–1838)
- David Salmons (1838 October–November)
- I. Q. Henriques (1838–1840)
- Moses Montefiore (1840 May–July)
- Hananel De Castro (1840–1841)
- Moses Montefiore (1841–1846)
- David Salomons (1846 March–August)
- Moses Montefiore (1846–1855)
- Isaac Foligno (1855 April–December)
- Moses Montefiore (1855–1857)
- Isaac Foligno (1855 February–September)
- Moses Montefiore (1857–1862)
- Joseph Meyer Montefiore (1862–1868)
- Moses Montefiore (1868 June–November)
- Joseph Meyer Montefiore (1868–1871)
- Moses Montefiore (1871–1874)
- Joseph Meyer Montefiore (1874–1880)
- Arthur Cohen (1880–1895)
- Joseph Sebag Montefiore (1895–1903)

20th century

- David Lindo Alexander (1903–1917)
- Stuart Samuel (1917–1922)
- Henry Henriques (1922–1925)
- Walter Rothschild, 2nd Baron Rothschild (1925–1926)
- Sir Osmond d'Avigdor-Goldsmid (1926–1933)
- Neville Laski (1933–1939)
- Selig Brodetsky (1940–1949)
- Abraham Cohen (1949–1955)
- Barnett Janner (1955–1964)
- Abraham Moss (1964), who died a few days after being elected
- Soloman Teff (1964–1967)
- Michael Fidler (1967–1973)
- Samuel Fisher, Baron Fisher of Camden (1973–1979)
- Greville Janner (1979–1985)
- Lionel Kopelowitz (1985–1991)
- Israel Finestein (1991–1994)
- Eldred Tabachnik (1994–2000)

21st century

- Josephine Wagerman (2000–2003), who had been headmistress of the JFS from 1985 to 1993
- Henry Grunwald (2003–2009)
- Vivian Wineman (2009–2015)
- Jonathan Arkush (2015–2018)
- Marie van der Zyl (2018–2024)
- Phil Rosenberg (2024–present)

== See also ==
- Anglo-Jewish Association, formed in 1871 for the "promotion of social, moral, and intellectual progress among the Jews; and the obtaining of protection for those who may suffer in consequence of being Jews"
- British Jews
- Conference of Presidents of Major American Jewish Organizations
- European Jewish Congress
- History of the Jews in England
- History of the Jews in Scotland
- History of the Jews in Wales
- Jewish Leadership Council
- League of British Jews, an Anglo-Jewish anti-Zionist organization that opposed the Balfour Declaration
- Presbyter Judaeorum, the chief official of the Jews of England prior to the Edict of Expulsion
- World Jewish Congress

== Bibliography ==
- Langham, Raphael (2010). 250 Years of Convention and Contention: A History of the Board of Deputies of British Jews 1760–2010. Vallentine Mitchell. ISBN 978-0853039822.
