= Sarah Gillespie =

British-American singer-songwriter

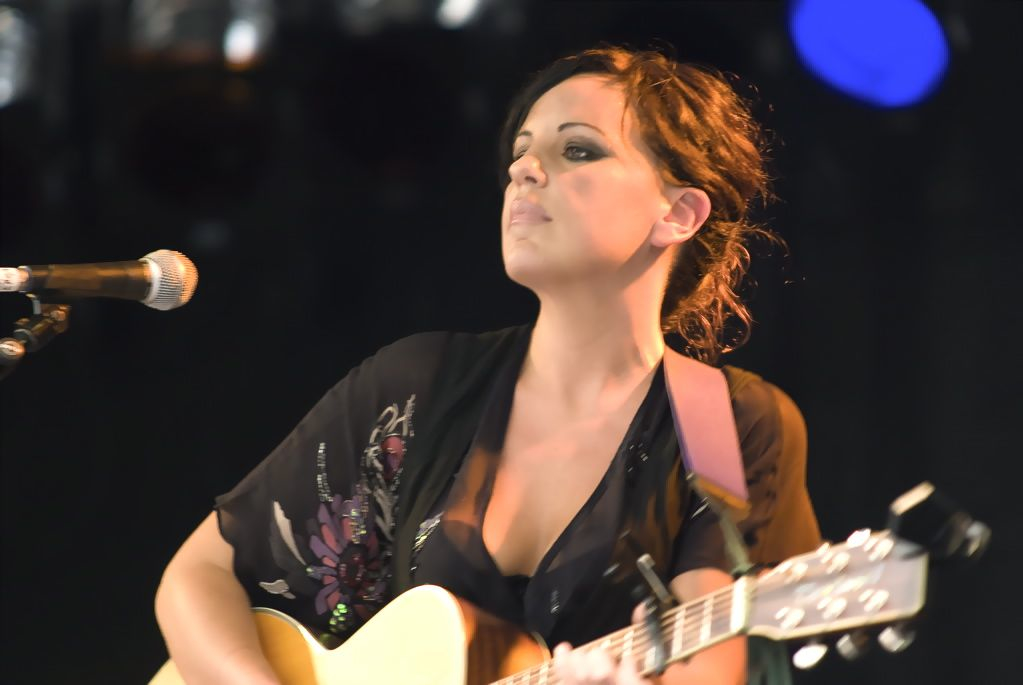
- Born: London, England
- Education: Goldsmiths, University of London
- Occupation: Singer-songwriter
- Website: www.sarahgillespie.com

Sarah Gillespie is a British-American singer-songwriter, poet and producer known for her blend of poetic lyrics with folk, blues, and jazz influences. She has released five albums, which have received critical acclaimn and she has collaborated with prominent jazz musicians including Chris Montague, Mercury Prize-nominated Kit Downes, Laura Jurd, James Maddren, and Ruth Goller. Gillespie's style is often compared to that of Bob Dylan and Tom Waits. Her work extends into arts education and advocacy: she founded the Create Now Academy in 2020 to mentor women in songwriting and creativity, and in 2025 launched the non-profit initiative "She Writes Songs", with events in the United States and the United Kingdom.

Her debut poetry collection, Queen Ithaca Blues, was published by Albion Beatnik Press.

== Biography ==
Sarah Gillespie was born in London, England, to an American mother and British father. She grew up in Norfolk, interspersed with numerous trips to Minnesota where she listened to Bessie Smith, Bob Dylan, Cole Porter and early blues and jazz. From the age of four, Gillespie composed songs on piano, and when she was 13 she began playing guitar. At 18, she moved to the United States, busking in the streets and playing gigs.

On returning to London, she gained a first-class degree in Film and Literature and an MA in Politics and Philosophy from Goldsmiths, University of London.

Gillespie plays festivals, clubs, arts centres and theatres in the UK and Europe. She has performed live on BBC Radio 4's Woman's Hour,

== Musical style ==
Gillespie composes her material on the guitar. She cites her main influences as Tom Waits, Cole Porter, Bob Dylan, early blues and jazz, poets T. S. Eliot and James Tate, and the 1950s Beat Poetry movement. Her style has been described as "mixing folk, jazz and blues" with an emphasis on the lyrical content and delivery. The Guardian's jazz critic John Fordham writes: "Gillespie, who joins Bob Dylan's lyrical bite and languid delivery to the forthrightness of Joni Mitchell, with a little rap-like percussiveness thrown in, is an original." Robert Shore of London's Metro points to "her Beat-like verbal collages ('Cinnamon ginseng bootleg bourbon Calvados Berlin') and beautifully controlled associative word strings, all delivered with her distinctive vocal mixture of dark romanticism and punkish attitude".

Gillespie's compositions "Houdini of the Heart" and "Cinematic Nectar" have been described as "blistering and beautiful" and "original, hard-edged".

== Discography ==
- Half Cut – 2024 (Pastiche Records)
- Susannah Threw A Helicopter – 2021 (Pastiche Records)
- Wishbones – 2018 (Pastiche Records)
- Roundhouse Bounty – 2016 (Audio Network)
- Glory Days – 2013 (Pastiche Records)
- The War on Trevor – 2012 (Pastiche Records)
- In The Current Climate – 2011 (Pastiche Records)
- "How The Mighty Fall" – single, 2009 (Egea)
- Stalking Juliet – 2009 (Egea)

== Reviews ==
Gillespie has received four and five star reviews from The Arts Desk, The Guardian, Mojo, The Independent, The Financial Times Metro, Rock n' Reel and the UK local press. English musician Robert Wyatt described In The Current Climate as "an utterly wonderful new record. Expected and got in spades Sarah's unique way with words plus terrific guitar playing, inspiring production and not just great songs, but totally original music. Brilliant, the bee's knees."

Gillespie's live performances have been described as 'outstanding, vivacious and forceful'. The Nottingham Evening Post noted "her verbal exchanges with her band were at times hilarious and on other occasions explosive".

Gillespie's album Wishbones (2018), received five stars from The Arts Desk and four stars from The Financial Times. Glory Days (2013) received five stars in Rock n' Real Magazine, five stars in Buzz Magazine, four stars in The Independent and the Financial Times. London's Metro commented: "Sarah Gillespie regularly has critics reaching for big-name comparisons. Is she the new Joni Mitchell? PJ Harvey? Bob Dylan even? Mixing jazz-folk artistry and punk attitude, third album Glory Days (Pastiche) recalls all three in places but Gillespie’s spiky lyrical gift is utterly distinctive."
