= Pedro Varela Geiss =

Spanish writer and revisionist historian

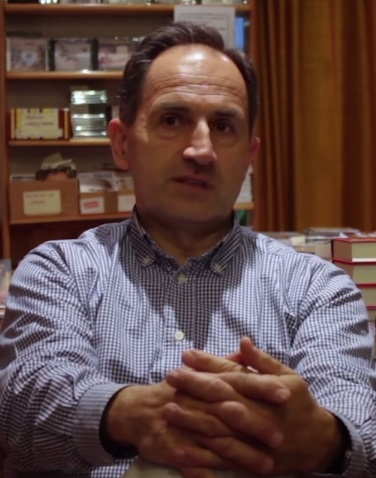
- Varela in an interview
- Born: 9 October 1957 (age 68); Barcelona, Spain
- Occupations: Bookseller, author, publisher
- Known for: Holocaust denial
- Criminal charges: Convicted for Holocaust denial

Pedro Varela Geiss (born 9 October 1957) is a Spanish writer, bookseller and Holocaust denier. He was the owner of a Neo-Nazi bookstore in Barcelona that is now closed, and he describes himself as a “National Socialist” inspired by Adolf Hitler. He was also the former President of the disbanded Neo-Nazi group CEDADE to which the Belgian Nazi collaborator Léon Degrelle belonged.

== Biography ==
Born in Barcelona, he became the President of CEDADE in 1978, publishing Holocaust denial material.

In 1992, he spent three months in pre-trial detention in Austria for a Nazi speech that he gave, but he was acquitted. After the end of CEDADE, he opened the Libreria Europa bookstore in Barcelona, from which he promoted pro-Nazi speeches, conferences, lectures, and books on anti-Semitic conspiracy theories. In 1998, he was sentenced to five years in prison for justifying genocide because of the Holocaust denial material that he sold at his store.

In 2010, he was sentenced to two years and nine months in prison for the felony of "disseminating genocidal ideals". He was released from prison on 8 March 2012. He went back to run his bookstore. However, in July 2016, his bookstore was closed down for inciting hate speech and racial discrimination.
