= Israel lobby in the United Kingdom =

Groups seeking to influence UK foreign policy

The Israel lobby in the United Kingdom comprises individuals and groups seeking to influence British foreign policy in favour of the State of Israel, bilateral ties with it, Zionism or the policies of the Israeli government. As any lobby, such individuals and groups may seek to influence politicians and political parties, the media, the general public or specific groups or sectors.

== History ==
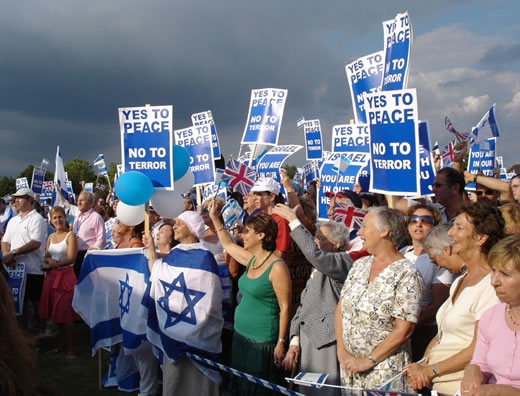
Pro-Israel rally in London

According to Donald P. Wagner writing in Sojourners magazine, what came to be known as "Christian Zionism" emerged in England in the early 19th century when Restoration of the Jews to the Holy Land and futuristic interpretation of apocalyptic texts merged. In 1839, the evangelical Anthony Ashley-Cooper, 7th Earl of Shaftesbury, called on Parliament to support the creation of a Jewish state in Palestine. During the 1840s, Henry John Temple, 3rd Viscount Palmerston, supported a "Jewish entity" allied to the Ottoman Empire as a counterweight to Egypt.

The journalist Geoffrey Wheatcroft writes that perhaps the "first lobbyist on behalf of the land of Israel" was Theodor Herzl, who, after publishing his book The Jewish State in 1896, and organising the First Zionist Congress in Basel, Switzerland, in 1897, met Cabinet ministers and other European officials. The Russian Zionist Chaim Weizmann began the process of convincing Arthur Balfour that Palestine should be the Jewish national home and the "British Zionist movement began actively lobbying the British government." The British Palestine Committee in Manchester also "lobbied for the mandate and Jewish rights in Palestine."

At this time the dominant organisations of the Jewish community in England, the Board of Deputies of British Jews and the Anglo-Jewish Association, were the "institutional stronghold of the anti-Zionist camp" and formed a Conjoint Foreign Committee to lobby the government on behalf of persecuted Jewish communities abroad and to oppose the efforts of Weizmann and his allies. In 1917, Weizmann and a small group of Zionists, in what Ahron Bregman called "a brilliant exercise of sustained persuasion, lobbying, and influence", persuaded the British government to publish the Balfour Declaration which supported "the establishment in Palestine of a national home for the Jewish people." (Weizmann later became the first President of the State of Israel.) Leaders of Board of Deputies of British Jews and of the Anglo-Jewish Association considered the Balfour Declaration a "veritable calamity" that would stamp "the Jews as strangers in their native lands."

According to the author Ritchie Ovendale, Britain, which held the British Mandate of Palestine ratified by the League of Nations after the First World War, abandoned its Zionist sympathies, "which had been secured by the Zionist lobby", because of fears of coming war with Nazi Germany. In 1939 Britain limited Jewish immigration to Palestine, thereby, Ovendale argues, becoming to Zionists "the principal enemy." In 1942, he writes, Zionists shifted their focus to influencing the United States through use of the "Zionist vote."

== Contemporary period ==
According to the journalist Rupert Cornwell, lobbying activities in relation to Israel, as with other issues, tend to be less formalised and on a smaller scale in the UK than such lobbying in the United States. According to Hannah Weisfeld, the director of the British pro-Israel, pro-peace organisation Yachad, there is no culture of lobbying in the UK, in contrast to the US.

British foreign policy is of much less importance to Israel than that of the United States, both because of the latter's much greater economic and military strength and because of the substantial and persistent military aid it supplies to Israel. However, Britain retains some ability to influence international affairs through its membership of the United Nations Security Council, its period of membership of the European Community and its historic role in the Middle East.

== Organisations and activities ==
=== Generalists ===
The Board of Deputies of British Jews and the Jewish Leadership Council are the leading bodies of the Jewish community in Britain. Consequently, their remit is wide and lobbying is a minor part of their role. Within lobbying, they are distinctive from smaller groups in lobbying, at least on occasion, a wide range of audiences.

==== Board of Deputies of British Jews ====
The Board of Deputies of British Jews is a forum for the views of most organisations within the British Jewish community, liaising with the British government on that basis. The Board states that the community "has a very strong attachment to the State of Israel" and articulates the community's concerns and positions on Israel to parliamentarians, the Foreign & Commonwealth Office, media and other faith groups. Its programme of engagement with embassies also encompasses ties between other countries and the State of Israel.

==== Jewish Leadership Council ====
The Jewish Leadership Council aims to forward the interests of the organised Jewish community in Britain. Its mission is to work, through its members, to ensure the continuity in the UK, in this and future generations, of a mainstream Jewish Community (that) is, inter alia: confident in its support for Israel.

According to the sociologists Tom Mills, Hilary Aked, Tom Griffin and David Miller, writing in OpenDemocracy, "Pro-Israel lobbying has always been an important part of its work. In December 2006 it established a non-charitable company, the Jewish Activities Committee, as a vehicle to handle political operations. The company's founding directors were Trevor Chinn, Henry Grunwald, BICOM's then vice-chair Brian Kerner and BICOM's chairman and main funder, the Finnish billionaire Poju Zabludowicz. That same month the JLC co-founded the Fair Play Campaign Group with the Board of Deputies, aiming 'to coordinate activity against boycotts of Israel and other anti-Zionist campaigns'. According to the JLC's website, the Fair Play Campaign Group 'acts as a coordinating hub' and 'keeps an eye out for hostile activity so it can be an early-warning system for pro-Israel organisations in the UK'. Fair Play later launched the Stop the Boycott campaign with BICOM, with the Jewish Activities Committee acting as a vehicle for donations."

==== The Zionist Federation of Great Britain and Ireland ====
The Zionist Federation of Great Britain and Ireland, founded in 1899, describes itself as "the UK's leading Israel advocacy and grassroots organisation" which "celebrates Israel and challenges our enemies." It describes itself as an umbrella organisation for the Zionist movement in the United Kingdom, representing more than 30 organisations and over 50,000 affiliated members. Its activities include: training, campaigning, media engagement, lobbying, combatting the BDS movement, working with students and cultural events.

=== Politics ===
"Speak Up for Israel in Parliament" lobby day leaflet, 2009

A number of groups lobby the government, politicians and political parties on behalf of Israel. Many politicians express their support through national political party "Friends of Israel" groups. The journalist Peter Oborne and the politicians Tam Dalyell and Jenny Tonge are among those who have described this as an "Israel lobby" or "Jewish lobby", an allegation described as antisemitic by anti-racist and Jewish communal organisations such as the Community Security Trust.

In 2003, Tam Dalyell, a member of Parliament (MP) for the Labour Party, said the prime minister and party leader, Tony Blair, was unduly influenced by a "cabal of Jewish advisers" in forming his Middle East policy towards Iraq, Syria and Iran. Dalyell initially named several influential British advisers of Jewish heritage, but later focused on Middle East envoy, Lord Levy, and mostly Jewish advisers to US President George W. Bush. Eric Moonman, president of the Zionist Federation of Great Britain and Ireland and a former Labour MP, said he was seeking advice on whether there was a case for referral of Dalyell to the Commons' commission for racial equality. He was also criticised by Dave Rich, who rejects the claim there are UK "AIPAC-style" lobbies.

The former Liberal Democrat MP Jenny Tonge, Baroness Tonge, said in 2006: "The pro-Israeli lobby has got its grips on the Western world, its financial grips. I think they've probably got a grip on our party." An all-party group of Lords led by the former Archbishop of Canterbury, George Carey, said her "irresponsible and inappropriate" comments "evoked a classic anti-Jewish conspiracy theory." Defending her comments, Tonge said that Walt and Mearsheimer's article "The Israel Lobby and U.S. Foreign Policy" that appeared in the 23 March 2006 issue of The London Review of Books provided evidence supporting her assertion that the "'Israel lobby' had a disproportionate voice in Anglo-American foreign policy." Tonge was reprimanded by the Liberal Party leader Menzies Campbell, who commented "I defend absolutely your right to express your views on the Middle East, including legitimate criticism of the state of Israel. But I do not believe that the remarks you used fell within that category." He added that the remarks had "clear anti-Semitic connotations" Jon Benjamin, chief executive of the Board of Deputies of British Jews, was quoted as saying: "If someone makes comments that are so at odds with what the party feels, and hopefully at odds with common decency, then one would hope that they are no longer made welcome in the party itself."

In 2006 Chris Davies, a Liberal Democrat member of the European Parliament (MEP), wrote to a pro-Israel constituent that she "enjoyed wallowing in her own filth". In a later message to her he complained about Israel's "racist policies of apartheid" and stated "I shall tell them that I intend to speak out against this oppression at every opportunity, and I shall denounce the influence of the Jewish lobby that seems to have far too great a say over the political decision-making process in many countries". As a consequence of the outcry raised by the attack on the constituent, Davies resigned soon after as leader of the Liberal Democrats group in the European Parliament.

In a December 2007 column, after the 2007 Labour party donation scandal ("Donorgate") broke, Assaf Uni of Haaretz wrote that there was concern in the Jewish community about "conspiracy theories regarding a 'Jewish plot' in the United Kingdom, and the role of the pro-Israel lobby there". In late 2007 it was revealed that David Abrahams, deputy chair of Labour Friends of Israel until 2002, had made secret and illegal donations through junior employees of 600,000 pounds sterling (approximately $1.2 million) to the Labour Party. Abrahams, "a Jewish millionaire", admitted in The Jewish Chronicle that he concealed his activity because "I didn't want Jewish money and the Labour Party being put together." The Daily Telegraph ran a photograph of Abrahams with the former Israeli ambassador to Britain Zvi Heifetz, and "insinuated that Israel was the source of the illegal campaign contributions." According to an article in Haaretz, several in the media have maintained there was a connection between money donated by Zionist Jews and the pro-Israel policy of Tony Blair and Gordon Brown. Jon Benjamin, chief executive of the Board of Deputies of British Jews, told The Forward, "Clearly there is a potential for it to turn against us." Writing about the scandal, journalist Yasmin Alibhai-Brown asked in The Independent about the roles of the Labour and Conservative Friends of Israel groups, given that the former Labour Friends leader David Abrahams was involved. She questioned the role in Labour victories of Jon Mendelsohn, noting that Mendelsohn is "a passionate Zionist and infamous lobbyist, described by The Jewish Chronicle as "one of the best-connected power brokers"." She stated her assumption that Labour Friends of Israel plays a part in shaping British foreign policies in the Middle East. She also questioned the donations and "back-room influence" of Labour Friends of India and Muslim Friends of Labour.

In 2009 a documentary, Inside Britain's Israel Lobby, by the journalist Peter Oborne was shown in the Channel 4 Dispatches series which aimed to expose the influence of the Israel lobby within British politics and alongside James Jones wrote a pamphlet investigating which groups make up the pro-Israel lobby, how they operate, and how they exert influence. The Guardian's Middle East editor, Ian Black, said the lobby was "bankrolling Tories." Ofcom received 50 complaints about the programme but cleared it of breaching broadcasting rules.

In 2010 the Labour MP Martin Linton said: "There are long tentacles of Israel in this country who are funding election campaigns and putting money into the British political system for their own ends," while his Jewish fellow Labour MP Gerald Kaufman said that right-wing Jewish millionaires had large stakes in the Conservative Party. The Community Security Trust spokesman Mark Gardner responded: "Anybody who understands antisemitism will recognise just how ugly and objectionable these quotes are, with their imagery of Jewish control and money power."

In 2012 Oborne wrote that "Some 80 per cent of all Tory MPs are members (of Conservative Friends of Israel), including most Cabinet ministers.... while its sponsors play an important role in financing both the Tories nationally, and MPs at the local level. There is no doubt that the CFI has exercised a powerful influence over policy." The Conservative MP Sir Alan Duncan in 2014 stated that despite UK rules forbidding political funding from abroad, in his view an exception was made for Israel, and later added that "the United States is in hock to a very powerful financial lobby which dominates its politics."

In 2017 Al Jazeera broadcast a four part series, The Lobby, about Israeli attempts to influence UK politics.

==== All-Party Britain-Israel Parliamentary Group ====
All-Party Groups are defined by the House of Commons as "relatively informal" groups whose members include "backbench Members of the House of Commons and Lords" and sometimes ministers and non-parliamentarians. They are classified as subject or country groups. Being cross-party, All-Party Groups are more talking-shops than lobbies trying to influence government policies. They are registered only "to control the extent to which groups use the House's facilities and status"

The "All-Party Britain-Israel Parliamentary Group" is an All-Party Group registered with the UK Parliament. Its stated purpose is "To create a better understanding of Israel, and to foster and promote links between Britain and Israel". The chair in the parliament dissolved on 30 March 2015 was MP Louise Ellman.

==== Friends of Israel (party political) ====
Conservative Friends of Israel (CFI) is affiliated with the Conservative Party and states that it is "one of the fastest growing political lobby groups." It lists its objectives as supporting Israel, promoting conservatism, fighting terrorism, combating antisemitism and peaceful co-existence in the Middle East. Iain Dale and Brian Brivati in The Daily Telegraph have described it as "a highly effective lobby group," writing that its director, Stuart Polak, has "done more than most to promote Israel's case to the right of British politics."

Labour Friends of Israel (LFI), founded in 1957, is a group within the Labour Party which in 2003 described itself as a "lobby group working within the Labour Party to promote the State of Israel". It describes itself as seeking "to promote a strong bilateral relationship between Britain and Israel." It organises visits of British politicians to Israel to meet with Israeli politicians and advocates on Israel's behalf among Labour Party members. Blair and Brown have been members of Labour Friends of Israel, and the subsequent leader of the Labour Party (Ed Miliband) described himself as a "friend of Israel".

Liberal Democrat Friends of Israel (LDFI) was the first such group formed. Its first objective is "to maximise support for the State of Israel within the Liberal Democrats and Parliament."

==== The Israel Britain Alliance ====
The Israel Britain Alliance was founded in 2016 in order to "increase support for Israel in Parliament". It was launched by the Zionist Federation and led by the former Labour MP for East Kilbride Michael McCann to build relationships between politicians and grassroots Israel supporters and strengthen ties between the House of Commons and the Knesset. McCann was a member of Trade Union Friends of Israel (TUFI) and a vice-chair of Labour Friends of Israel.

=== Media ===
BICOM is the principal group seeking to influence UK media coverage in favour of Israel. Influencing can be directed at media owners, executives and frontline employees. Some commentators are known for their expressions of support for Israel.

In a September 2001 column in The Observer about the September 11 attacks in the United States, Richard Ingrams noted "the reluctance throughout the media to contemplate the Israeli factor" and, commenting on Britain, cited "pressure from the Israeli lobby in this country that many, even normally outspoken journalists, are reluctant even to refer to such matters." He also noted their reluctance to address issues he had mentioned in past columns related to Lord Levy, the Labour Party and to the "close business links with Israel" of the press magnates Rupert Murdoch and Conrad Black. Earlier in August, Times journalist, Sam Kiley, resigned from the newspaper as he claimed his work was severely censored by senior executives due to the Zionist sympathies of Rupert Murdoch.

In 2002 Palestine Is Still the Issue, made by the documentary filmmaker John Pilger, was shown on ITV. The Board of Deputies of British Jews, Conservative Friends of Israel and the Israeli Embassy expressed "outrage" and, according to Pilger, demanded a "pro-Israel" film. Pilger said the BBC would not have "dared to incur the wrath of one of the most influential lobbies in this country" by showing the film, citing comments written by Tim Llewellyn, the BBC's former Middle East correspondent, that the BBC continues to "duck" the issue. Pilger stated this was "one example of pressure exerted on British journalists from Zionists and the Israeli embassy."

==== BICOM ====
Founded in 2000, the Britain Israel Communications and Research Centre (BICOM) seeks to present Israel's case to journalists. The Observer has described it as "Britain's most active pro-Israeli lobbying organisation" and as an "influential Jewish lobby group".

The London-based Jewish Chronicle reported that Brian Kerner, former chair of Joint Israel Appeal, argued that there was "the need for a body able to orchestrate British Jewry's political and public relations" after the year 2000 outbreak of the Second Intifada. The day after it began, fifty Jewish leaders met with the Israeli ambassador and "raised an initial £250,000 fund for pro-Israel lobbying and public relations." BICOM was founded as a consequence. The article also noted that "a debate goes on in the community's upper echelons over whether BICOM should remain a mainly-behind-the-scenes player focussing on media or a more upfront pro-Israel lobby similar to the American Aipac..."

According to a 2002 article in The Guardian, BICOM and the Board of Deputies of British Jews had "adopted aggressive media strategies to defend Israel and attack its critics in Britain." That year, leaders of the British Jewish community called in two high-level American strategists "to conduct research into the extent of hostility to Israel in Britain with a view to the British Jewish community launching a big public relations drive." In particular, focus groups were "said to have found particular hostility among professional and academic groups." The American paper The Forward reported that in 2005 Steve J. Rosen, then American Israel Public Affairs Committee (AIPAC) policy director, led an ambitious and "semisecret" effort to start similar pro-Israel lobbying organisations in the United Kingdom due to rising antisemitism and anti-Israel sentiment. In early 2008, The Jewish Chronicle reported that a new, yet unnamed London-based organisation would examine whether Israel received fair media coverage, but that it would not compete with BICOM.

In autumn 2008 a senior Israeli government official shared his opinions on competition between BICOM, which he said wants to maintain its primary role in the UK, and the US-based Israel Project. He stated that BICOM charged that the Israel Project doesn't understand how to work with British journalists and said "We don't want to get into this. We work with both organisations." The Israel Project denied there was competition and BICOM declined to comment saying "We don't respond to speculation."

=== Society ===
Society, encompassing academia, local government and other fields, has taken on greater importance as Israel and its supporters have sought to counter pro-Palestinian sentiment and activities, such as the Boycott, Divestment and Sanctions movement.

In October 2007 all speakers withdrew in protest from an Oxford Union debate on the one-state solution. One of the speakers, Ghada Karmi, a Palestinian research fellow at the University of Exeter and vice-chair of CAABU (the Council for Arab-British Understanding), wrote on The Guardian's blog that "the newest and least attractive import from America, following on behind Coca-Cola, McDonald's and Friends, is the pro-Israel lobby." She states the Oxford Union withdrew its invitation to speak to the American Jewish scholar and Israel critic Norman Finkelstein, asserting it was "apparently intimidated by threats from various pro-Israel groups".

In October 2007 Amjad Barham, head of the Council of the Palestinian Federation of Unions of University Professors and Employees, wrote that the "Israel lobby in the UK" was behind the decision of the University and College Union (UCU) to cancel the UK speaking tour of some Palestinian academics. He asserted Palestinian academic unions could "detect the not-so-hidden hand of the lobby in this latest episode of stifling debate on issues pertaining to Israeli policies and the complicity of the Israeli academy in perpetuating them."

A 2017 paper, Advocating Occupation: Outsourcing Zionist Propaganda in the UK, was published in eSharp, a student-run postgraduate journal of University of Glasgow, referred to "an Israeli state-sponsored strategy focused on controlling public opinion in the UK" that seek to "discredit and neutralise pro-Palestinian discourses". The university added a disclaimer to the article in 2020, apologising for subpar research and describing its content as "antisemitic". This was followed, in October 2021, by a petition signed by 500 scholars, calling on the university to retract the disclaimer. In August 2021, the university republished the article removing the apology and claim of antisemitism, but maintained a preface that said that the article has caused offence, and "employs some discursive strategies, including a biased selection of sources as well as the misrepresentation of data, which promote what some would regard as an unfounded theory regarding the State of Israel and its activity in the United Kingdom."

==== Britain Israel Trade Union Dialogue ====
The Britain Israel Trade Union Dialogue, previously Trade Union Friends of Israel, operates in the trade union movement.

==== Friends of Israel (geographical) ====
Sussex Friends of Israel, based in Brighton, was established in 2013.

North London Friends of Israel was established in 2014.

There is an Essex Friends of Israel.

North West Friends of Israel was established in 2014 and organises activities in Manchester.

There is a North-East Friends of Israel group.

The Yorkshire Friends of Israel is based in Leeds.

The Confederation of Friends of Israel Scotland are active in Scotland.

There is also a Northern Ireland Friends of Israel group.

==== Israel Advocacy Movement ====
The aim of the Israel Advocacy Movement is to establish a mass movement of Israeli advocates in the UK. It provides training and promotional materials and advocates the use of social media and a network of street level advocacy teams. In June 2019 it hosted a debate entitled 'should Zionists support a white ethno state?' with the far-right activist Mark Collett.

==== Israel Coalition ====
In July 2020, the Israel Advocacy Movement, David Collier, Sussex Friends of Israel and North West Friends of Israel announced their joint founding of the Israel Coalition to "resource, unify and amplify the most successful online pro-Israel initiatives".

==== UK Lawyers for Israel ====
UK Lawyers for Israel (UKLFI) was founded in 2011 by Jonathan Turner. It has been described as "instrumental in a number of significant victories for pro-Israel campaigns and against antisemitism in the UK." It has been represented on the Board of Deputies of British Jews since 2016. Caroline Kendal, its director of operations, in 2016 said "...what we're about is actually standing for Israel, and doing that as effectively as we possibly can." In that year, it claimed about 1,400 members and associates, of whom about half were lawyers. Much of its activity is in relation to universities. It played a key role in the prevention of a second "Gaza flotilla" setting sail from Greece in 2011, by invoking international maritime law. In 2019 it was described by Hil Aked in Mondoweiss as having "at the very least ... an informal working relationship with the Israeli Ministry of Foreign Affairs". Later that year, in the face of planned protests, the group abandoned plans to host a speaker from Regavim, a pro-settler organisation labelled extremist by the Jewish Labour Movement and Yachad, which campaigns against the building of Arab and Bedouin settlements in the West Bank. In 2025 Jonathan Turner, the chief executive of the group, was criticised by the Palestine Solidarity Campaign for a saying that criticism of the Gaza war and subsequent risk of famine in Gaza "ignored factors that may increase average life expectancy in Gaza, bearing in mind that one of the biggest health issues in Gaza prior to the current war was obesity".

==== Union of Jewish Students ====
The Union of Jewish Students supports Jewish societies on 60 campuses across the UK. Its core values include "Engagement with Israel:...offering opportunities to strengthen, celebrate and explore a personal relationship with Israel as part of an evolving expression of Jewish identity".

In 2018-19, UJS supported over 11,000 students on 'Israel programmes'. UJS declared "We wanted to portray Israel in a positive way on campus through Israeli culture, society and politics." In spring 2020, the UJS launched Spring into Israel, "a campaign to ensure we have as many Israel related events on campus during this month." The organisational partners were BICOM, We Believe in Israel and the Zionist Federation of Great Britain and Ireland. Previous campaigns have included Bridges not Boycotts, Dialogue not Division and Exploring Zionism.

==== We Believe in Israel ====
Founded in 2011, We Believe in Israel facilitates and supports a grassroots network of supporters of Israel in the UK. Its launch followed two pro-Israel conferences held in the UK in 2011 and 2015. Its founding director was PR consultant and Labour Party activist Luke Akehurst, who was elected as an MP in 2024. In May 2019, the organisation announced the recruitment of its 20,000th activist.

==== StandWithUs ====
The US-based StandWithUs operates in the UK. It describes itself as equipping students to be effective Israel educators. In September 2019, it organised a three-day conference and announced record numbers of students on its programmes.

=== Faith ===
The number and scale of faith organisations which promote Israel actively are limited. This is distinct from the expression of viewpoints by faith organisations on the issue.

==== Christian Zionist groups ====
Christian Zionist groups in Britain continue the tradition of supporting Israel as part of the fulfillment of prophecy. Such groups often are criticised for their beliefs (per the Book of Ezekiel and the Book of Zechariah) that only those Jews who convert to Christianity will be spared a fiery death when Jesus returns. Christian Friends of Israel, UK explicitly rejects such a view in its "Foundation Principles." Other such groups include the Church's Ministry Among Jewish People (The Israel Trust of the Anglican Church), Bridges for Peace, Christian Zionists for Israel UK and International Christian Embassy Jerusalem, UK.

=== Community ===
Several groups seek to strengthen associations and empathy between Jews in the United Kingdom, particularly young people, and Israel. Their activities can take a range of forms, including those relating to culture, education, faith, leisure and philanthropy.

==== Habonim Dror ====
Habonim Dror is a Jewish Socialist-Zionist cultural youth movement. Its mission includes "to build a socialist, culturally Jewish future in the State of Israel". Habonim Dror United Kingdom (HDUK) has six kenim (branches). When chanichimot are 16, they go on Israel Tour, a month trip around Israel, where they are immersed in the culture and history of Israel. After returning from Israel Tour, participants become Madrichimot (leaders) and will spend the year doing Hadracha (leadership) training in preparation for them to take on roles in the summer across a variety of Machanot. Every year chanichimot who have just finished high school travel to Israel for a year on Shnat Hachshara, commonly referred to as Shnat, where they go on an extensive experiential and educational process and actively carry out movement aims and engage with Israeli society.

==== Jewish National Fund ====
The Jewish National Fund says "JNF UK is Britain's oldest Israel charity and has supported the Zionist pioneers since the days of the Second Aliyah. Today we are working to ensure that the people of Israel who live in the underdeveloped south of the country can also share in the Jewish State's success story.is active in every area of Israeli life."

==== UJIA ====
The UJIA (United Jewish International Appeal) seeks to enhance young British Jews' sense of Jewish identity and their connection with Israel. UJIA's remit includes overseeing and sponsoring Israel group tours that are organised by Jewish religious and ideological organisations for young people in the Jewish community. In 2017 UJIA launched a £300,000 fund to invest in Israeli start-up businesses that are concerned with improving education, employment and community development. The British Prime Minister, Theresa May, was the guest speaker at a dinner, hosted by UJIA on 17 September 2018, that was held to mark the 70th anniversary of the foundation of Israel.

== See also ==
- European Friends of Israel
- British–Zionist conflict
- Israel–United Kingdom relations
- Jewish lobby
- Lobbying in the United Kingdom
- The Lobby (TV series)
- Israel lobby in the United States
- Israel lobby in Canada
- Israel lobby in Australia
