= Friends of Israel =

Friends of Israel may refer to:

- Friends of Israel Initiative
- Parliamentary groups in the United Kingdom that promote close ties between Britain and Israel:
  - Labour Friends of Israel
  - Conservative Friends of Israel
  - Liberal Democrat Friends of Israel
- Friends of Israel in the Parliament of Norway
- Northern Ireland Friends of Israel
- European Friends of Israel
- Anglican Friends of Israel
- Friends of the Israel Defense Forces
- Clerical Association of Friends of Israël or Opus sacerdotale Amici Israel, an association of Catholic priests (1926 – 1928)

== See also ==
- Friends of Palestine (disambiguation)
