= Adrian Cohen =

English lawyer

Adrian Leon Cohen (born 22 July 1963) is an English solicitor who is also Senior Vice-President of the Board of Deputies of British Jews and Lay Chair of the Labour Friends of Israel.

== Early life and education ==
Cohen, who was born at Mile End in the London Borough of Tower Hamlets, grew up in Ilford in the London Borough of Redbridge and went to Wanstead High School. He studied at the London School of Economics and Political Science (LSE), where he received a bachelor's degree in Law, and at Queen Mary University of London where he was awarded a Master of Laws degree.

He chaired the Union of Jewish Students from 1985 to 1986.

== Professional career ==
On leaving university, Cohen became a pupil barrister. He qualified as a solicitor in 1996.

Between 1988 and 1990 he was a part-time tutor at LSE, teaching commercial law.

Cohen has been Senior Consultant at McDermott Will & Emery since May 2024. He was previously a partner at Proskauer Rose LLP and, before that, worked for 32 years at Clifford Chance, becoming a partner in 1998.

== Political office ==
He was briefly a London Borough of Camden councillor in 2022.

== Voluntary roles ==
Cohen is an elected honorary officer of the Board of Deputies and took office as its Senior Vice-President in June 2024. He is also Lay Chair of the Labour Friends of Israel,

He was a trustee of the Jewish Leadership Council from 2018 to 2021. He is a founder member of the London Jewish Forum, of which he was co-chair until June 2024. He was also, for two terms until 2023, a trustee of Reprieve UK, the legal action NGO.

== Personal life ==
Adrian was married to Caroline Fertleman and had three children. They lived in Highgate, London.

In September 2022 he married Marie van der Zyl, the then-President of the Board of Deputies of British Jews, at West London Synagogue.
