= Yahad =

Yahad or Yachad (Hebrew: יחד, lit. 'Together') may refer to:

== Politics (Israel) ==
- Together (b'Yahad), an electoral alliance founded in 2026 by Bennett 2026 and Yesh Atid
- Yachad (political party), a minor right-wing religious party founded in 2014
- Yahad, a name used by the party Meretz (2003–2006)
- Yahad (1984 political party), a centrist party formed by Ezer Weizman (1984–1986)

== Geography ==
- Yahad, Israel, a kibbutz in northern Israel

== Organizations ==
- Yachad (NGO), a UK-based non-governmental organization
- Yahad-In Unum, a French association that locates Holocaust-era mass graves
- Yachad (organization), a US-based organization for people with disabilities
