= Henry Grunwald =

Henry Grunwald may refer to:

- Henry A. Grunwald (1922–2005), Austrian-born journalist, diplomat and managing editor of Time magazine
- Henry Grunwald (barrister) (born 1949), former president of the Board of Deputies of British Jews
