= Embargoed (organization) =

UK-based human rights organisation

Embargoed is a UK-based human rights organisation campaigning to bring an immediate and unconditional end to all embargoes against the people of Northern Cyprus. Embargoed does not prescribe any political remedy, but considers the embargoes on the people of Northern Cyprus to be unjust and immoral. It does not consider itself a nationalist organisation, and its manifesto commits it to being multi-cultural, and avoiding politics. The group also campaigns for 1964 to be recognised as the start of the embargoes, this being the year of the breakdown of the power sharing between Greek and Turkish Cypriots (see Cyprus dispute).

Activities include organising marches and demonstrations to raise public awareness.

In the UK the campaign has received the backing of the Communication Workers Union and Sarah Ludford a UK Member of the European Parliament.
