= Union of Jewish Students =

Student organization in the United Kingdom and Ireland

Union of Jewish Students of the United Kingdom & Ireland
- Founded: 1919; 107 years ago
- Type: Student union
- Location: London, UK
- Region served: The United Kingdom and the Republic of Ireland
- Members: c. 86 Jewish Societies, > 9,000 members
- Key people: Raphi Leon (President); Mervyn Kaye (CEO)
- Revenue: £1.8m
- Employees: c. 12
- Volunteers: 450+
- Website: www.ujs.org.uk
- Formerly called: The Inter University Jewish Federation

The Union of Jewish Students of the United Kingdom and Ireland (UJS) represents Jewish students in the United Kingdom and Ireland. It is a member of the World Union of Jewish Students (WUJS) and the European Union of Jewish Students (EUJS) and an associate member of the National Union of Students, and is represented on the Board of Deputies of British Jews.

== History ==
=== Launch ===
The IUJF (Inter University Jewish Federation) was the creation in 1919 of the Manchester Jewish Association. They saw a growing pride in the Jewish Community and believed it was appropriate for Jewish students to have a national organisation to co-ordinate the activities of Jewish student Societies and represent Jewish students at a national level.

The first step was a conference in Manchester on 17 July 1919 at which four Jewish societies were represented: Manchester, Liverpool, Leeds, and Oxford. Although not represented initially, the London University Jewish Society subsequently took an active and eventually a leading role.

=== Early years ===
With the rise to power in Germany of the Nazi Party, many Jewish students had their studies disrupted and sought refuge in non-occupied Europe and elsewhere; the International Students Service was in the forefront of providing advice to these displaced students and financial assistance was made available from communal funds. The Federation was active in supporting these efforts; almost £2,000 was raised from University students in Britain.

By 1946, the following Universities had societies affiliated to the Federation, in addition to those already mentioned: Belfast, Birmingham, Cambridge, University College, Cardiff, Dublin, Durham, Edinburgh, Glasgow, London, Reading, and Sheffield.

The two main activities of the Federation, from its inception, were an annual Summer School and an Annual Conference, held in the winter vacation.

Throughout its existence, the IUJF was involved with the Jewish community. It was represented on the Board of Deputies of British Jews and the Zionist Federation and had an ongoing liaison with Jewish Youth Study Groups.

For the almost fifty years from its foundation until the creation of the Hillel Foundation, the IUJF had no office, no staff, no sabbatical officers and no assured budget other than money that students could raise themselves. The Federation was run from the rooms of the then Chairman or Secretary; all activities were organized by the students themselves on a voluntary basis; from time to time, small subventions were obtained from the general community.

=== Expansion ===
The partnership with which B'nai B'rith set up the Hillel Foundation provided the IUJF with its first permanent office and its first professional assistance. This enabled the Federation and its successor, UJS, to increase its work.

The organization was renamed the Union of Jewish Students in 1973.

== Activities and values ==
As of 2021, UJS represents approximately 8,500 students, with 4,000–4,500 being members of its 69 affiliated Jewish Societies (J-Socs) on individual campuses. Expenditure in 2020/21 was under £1m. It states that its core values are: cross-communalism, peer-leadership, representation and engagement with Israel. Its communal partners and supporters include the Jewish Leadership Council, UJIA and the Community Security Trust.

It provides training and funding for individual J-Socs; campaigns on specific issues; offers members the opportunity to participate in networking events, master classes and a summer placement scheme; runs national events to bring together Jewish students, including the JUEFA Cup football tournament, the UJS training Summit, the UJS Conference, the UJS Student Awards, Shabbat UK and Jewniversity Challenge, and; works with universities to secure Jewish student accommodation and spaces for J-Soc activities as well as sourcing kosher food and students' other religious needs. It also organises a range of trips to Israel.

It has been active within the National Union of Students, including its Anti-Racism and Anti-Fascism campaigns. It has supported the campaigns of Wes Streeting, Aaron Porter, and Shakira Martin for the role of NUS President in 2008, 2010, and 2017, respectively. UJS funds delegations of Students’ Union leaders to visit Israel.

In April 2019, the UJS called on Sheffield University to "take all actions necessary" against a lecturer who had signed a petition in support of suspended MP Chris Williamson. In October 2019, the Union of Jewish Students demanded that the University of Nottingham cancel a planned lecture by Williamson.

== Leadership ==
The UJS President is elected by Jewish students to represent their voices within the community, universities, colleges and wider society.

Title	Name	Years in office	University	Notes
President	Raphi Leon	2026-2027	University of Warwick	
President	Louis Danker	2025–2026	Edinburgh University	
President	Sami Berkoff	2024–2025	Durham University	
President	Edward Isaacs	2023–2024	Bristol University	
President	Joel Rosen	2022–2023	University of Cambridge, Trinity Hall	
President	Nina Freedman	2021–2022	Bristol University	
President	James Harris	2020–2021	Birmingham University	
President	Esther Offenberg	2019–2020	Birmingham University	
President	Hannah Rose	2018–2019	Bristol University	
President	Josh Holt	2017–2018	University of Nottingham	
President	Josh Seitler	2016–2017	London School of Economics	
President	Hannah Brady	2015–2016	King's College London (BA); University College London (MA)	
President	Ella Rose	2014–2015	University of Nottingham	
President	Yos Tarshish (Joe Tarsh)	2013–2014	Manchester Metropolitan University	
President	Alex Green	2012–2013	University of Birmingham	
President	Daniel Grabiner	2011–2012	University of Leeds (BA); London Business School (MBA)	
Chairperson	Alex Dwek	2010–2011	University of Manchester	
Chairperson	Adam Pike	2008–2010	University of Manchester	
Chairperson	Jessica Truman	2007–2008	Manchester Metropolitan University	
Chairperson	Jonathan Levy	2006–2007	University of Manchester	
Chairperson	Wallace Rosenberg	2005–2006	University of Manchester	
Chairperson	Dan Sacker	2004–2005	University of Manchester	
Chairperson	Mark Ross	2003–2004	Queen Mary University of London	
Chairperson	Alan Senitt	2001–2003	University of Birmingham	
Chairperson	Ashley Hirst	2000–2001	University of Manchester	
Chairperson	Ruth Bookatz	1999–2000	University of Manchester	
Chairperson	Adam Dawson	1998–1999	University of Leeds	
Chairperson	Danny Newman	1997–1998	University of Oxford	
Chairperson	Susie Simmons	1996–1997	Manchester Metropolitan University	
Chairperson	Nick Cosgrove	1995–1996	University of Hull	
Chairperson	David Kaplan	1994–1995	University of Glasgow	
Chairperson	Tony Danker	1993–1994	University of Manchester	
Chairperson	Robert Sumroy	1992–1993	University of Cambridge	
Chairperson	Ian Myers	1991–1992	Manchester Polytechnic	
Chairperson	Howard Silverman	1990–1991	Keele University	
Chairperson	Jonny Mendelsohn	1989–1990	University of Leeds	
Chairperson	Stephen Kurer	1988–1989	University College London	
Chairperson	Paul Frosh	1987–1988	University of Cambridge	
Chairperson	Ashley Harshak	1986–1987	University of Newcastle upon Tyne	
Chairperson	Adrian Cohen	1985–1986	London School of Economics	
Chairperson	Simon Myerson	1984–1985	University of Cambridge	
Chairperson	Matthew Kalman	1983–1984	University of Cambridge	
Chairman	Sam Clarke	1982–1983	University of Sheffield	
Chairman	Sam Jacobs	1981–1982		
Chairman	Danny Joseph	1980–1981	University of Leeds	
Chairman	Rowel Genn	1979–1980	Queens University, Belfast	
Chairman	David Waxman	1978–1979		
Chairman	Moshe Forman	1977–1978		
Chairman	Simon Caplan	1976–1977	University of Oxford	
Chairman	Mark Dines	1975–1976	University of Manchester	
Interim Co-chairman	Melvyn Kay	1974–1975		
Interim Co-chairman	Andrew Jacobs	1974–1975		
Chairman	Phil Shilco	1974	King's College London	
Chairman	Alan Freeman	1973–1974	School of Oriental and African Studies (SOAS)	
Chairman	David Bloch	1972–1973	University College London	
Chairman	Rosalind Nysenbaum	1971–1972	Queen Mary University of London	
Chairman	Arnold Wagner OBE	1970-1971	Middlesex University	
Chairman	David Rosenberg	1969–1970	University of Glasgow	
Chairman	Alan Baker	1968	University College London	
Chairman	Gordon Hausmann	1967		
Chairman	Alan Gold	1966		
Chairman	Leslie Wagner	1965		
Chairman	Mike Hunter	1964		
Chairman	Justin Phillips	1963		
Chairman	Prof Edgar Neufeld	1955–1956		
Chairman	Mr Benjamin	1956		
Chairman	Michael Saltman	1954		
Chairman	Geoffrey Silver	1950–1951		
Chairman	Chaim Herzog	1941–1942	University College London	
Chairman	Lionel Stoll	1933–1934		

== See also ==
- British Jews
