= Yachad (NGO) =

Jewish NGO in the United Kingdom (est. 2011)

Yachad יחד
- Founded: 2011
- Type: Non-profit; NGO
- Purpose: Two-state solution to the Israeli–Palestinian conflict
- Location: United Kingdom
- Method: Education and advocacy
- Key people: Hannah Weisfeld
- Website: yachad.org.uk

Yachad (Hebrew: יחד, lit. 'together') is a non-governmental organization based in the United Kingdom. It describes itself as "pro-Israel, pro-peace".

== Positions ==
Yachad asserts that "Israel's best hope for safety and security lies in a comprehensive peace with its neighbors. That means a two-state solution: Israel and Palestine." According to Yachad, "time is running out and the two-state solution is in peril". Facing this situation, "Now is the moment for diaspora Jews to play their part and do all they can in the search for peace."

Yachad supports the creation of a Palestinian state based on 1967 borders, with mutually agreed land swaps, supports United Nations recognition of Palestinian statehood, opposes the expansion of West Bank settlements (and supported UN resolutions against this), opposed the 2020 Trump peace plan for Israel/Palestine, and opposes Israeli plans to annex the West Bank.

== Activities ==
Yachad has a wide-ranging programme of activities through campaigns that claim to aim to build support for those in Israel working for peace and democracy. Yachad organizes day trips to East Jerusalem and the southern West Bank.

It has campaigned against evictions of Palestinian Arab households in East Jerusalem.

It has commissioned major surveys of British Jewish opinion about the Middle East, including in 2015 and 2016.

Speakers at its events have included the former head of the Shin Bet, Ami Ayalon (2014, 2016) anti-Brexit campaigner Gina Miller(2017), Labour MPs Wes Streeting (2019) and Stephen Twigg (2019), Conservative former UK Minister of State for the Middle East Alistair Burt (2019, 2022), historian Simon Schama (2021), Palestinian Liberal Democrat MP Layla Moran, Israeli human rights lawyer Michael Sfard, and journalist Jonathan Freedland (2023).

Its donors include Trevor Chinn.

== History ==
Yachad was launched in May 2011, “to provide a voice for British Jews who believe that to be pro-Israel today means safeguarding a Jewish and democratic Israel within internationally recognized borders, through the creation of a Palestinian state.”

In 2012, Yachad ran 88 events attended by 3,480 people, and raised £87,372 ($132,289) from 88 donors.

In 2013, its application to join the Zionist Federation was rejected, a decision criticised by communal leaders such as Jeremy Newmark, chief executive of the Jewish Leadership Council, and Vivian Wineman, president of the Board of Deputies.

By 2014, its director said it had 4,000 supporters and hundreds of donors. That year it was admitted to the Board of Deputies after a vote that was postponed twice due to controversy; the vote passed by 135 to 61.

During the 2014 Israel–Gaza conflict Yachad organised 1000 members of the British Jewish community, to lobby Mark Lyall Grant — as UK ambassador, then President of the United Nations Security Council — to secure a ceasefire between Israel and Gaza.

In 2019, Stephen Twigg described it as an “increasingly important player” in the UK Parliament.

In 2023, it protested in solidarity with the judicial reform protests in Israel and refused to attend a meeting with an Israeli minister during them.

During the 2023 Israeli invasion of the Gaza Strip, Yachad promoted pro-peace and Israeli moderate voices in the UK. It commemorated Israelis murdered in the October 7 attack by Hamas and later participated in “Humanity, Not Hatred” peace vigils organised by the Together Coalition led by Brendan Cox.
