= Labour Friends of Israel =

Parliamentarian group in UK supporting closer ties with Israel

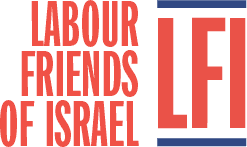
- Abbreviation: LFI
- Formation: October 1957
- Purpose: Promotes support for a strong bilateral relationship between Britain and Israel
- Headquarters: London
- Members: 120
- Official language: English
- Honorary President: Joan Ryan
- Parliamentary Chair: Mark Sewards
- Lay Chair: Adrian Cohen
- Director: Michael Rubin
- Website: lfi.org.uk

Labour Friends of Israel (LFI) is a group in the Parliament of the United Kingdom that advocates for Israel, which it considers the "historic homeland" of the Jewish people. LFI says it supports a two-state solution to the Israeli–Palestinian conflict, with Israel recognised and secure within its borders, and the establishment of a viable Palestinian state. As of July 2020, it comprised around one quarter of the Parliamentary Labour Party.

== History ==
LFI was founded at the 1957 Labour Party Conference. Its membership is organised into local branches. Seeking to strengthen the bond between the Labour Party and the Israeli Labor Party, it organises meetings of senior figures in both the UK and Israel.

=== 2000–2015 ===
In 2003, LFI described itself as "a Westminster based lobby group working within the British Labour Party to promote the State of Israel". It has been described as "less unquestioning in its support of the Israeli government than the Conservative Friends of Israel". Between 2001 and 2009, LFI sponsored more than 60 MPs to visit Israel, more than any other group.

In 2010, Jennifer Gerber, previously director of Progress and before that, special advisor to Andy Burnham, was appointed director.

In 2011, LFI adopted a new strategy of becoming a wider membership organisation and of operating under the slogan "Working Towards a Two-State Solution".

In 2011, John Woodcock was appointed chair, followed in May 2013 by Dame Anne McGuire and, in 2015, Joan Ryan.

In 2014, Adrian Cohen, a corporate lawyer, the chair of the London Jewish Forum, a trustee of the Jewish Leadership Council and a deputy of the Board of Deputies of British Jews, was appointed Lay Chair.

=== 2016 onwards ===
With the ascent to the leadership of the Labour Party, in September 2015, of Jeremy Corbyn, who has a history of support for Palestinians, the relationship between the LFI and the party leadership deteriorated.

LFI had been depleted of Parliamentary supporters who had lost their seats at the 2015 general election. In 2016, LFI announced it had trebled its number of Parliamentary supporters, stating that 65 MPs had pledged to back the group, at a time when many MPs rebelled against the leadership of the party. LFI re-branded itself as "Labour Friends of Israel: For Israel, For Palestine, For Peace", created a Young LFI group, and stated it would support the Alliance for Middle East Peace's international fund.

In early 2017, Al Jazeera released a four-part documentary entitled The Lobby, which investigated aspects of the Israel lobby in the United Kingdom, particularly relating to the Labour Party. A member of Israeli embassy staff, Shai Masot, was recorded "plotting" to take down British MPs who favour recognition of a Palestinian state; links to the Labour Friends of Israel were put under the spotlight, including a reference to the availability of £1m from the Israeli government.

In March 2018, supporters of LFI, along with the Board of Deputies of British Jews and the Jewish Leadership Council, took part in a protest critical of the Corbyn leadership, stating that antisemitism was present in the Labour Party.

In February 2019, after having lost a vote of no confidence by her local constituency Labour Party, Joan Ryan resigned from the Labour Party to join the recently formed The Independent Group, but retained her position as Chair of LFI. She became Honorary President in August 2019 and Dame Louise Ellman succeeded her as Parliamentary Chair. In October 2019, Ellman resigned from the Labour Party. Neither stood for reelection in the 2019 general election. However, despite resigning from the Labour Party, they remained members of LFI.

As of July 2020, around a quarter of the Parliamentary Labour Party and a third of the shadow cabinet were members of the group. In September 2020, Jennifer Gerber stepped down as director and was replaced by Michael Rubin. In September 2020, LFI doubled its number of vice-chairs to 11, with the addition of Rosie Cooper, Chris Evans, Dame Diana Johnson, Peter Kyle, Conor McGinn and Catherine McKinnell.

In 2026, LFI was referred to the Electoral Commission over concerns about lack of transparency about funding sources.

=== Related groups ===
The Yigal Allon Educational Trust, founded in 1985 by former Prime Minister Harold Wilson, MP Ian Mikardo, Lord Glenamara and others, has supported Labour Friends of Israel.

== Parliamentary supporters of LFI ==
As of February 2022, the officers, sitting MPs, Lords and former members who were supporters of LFI are set out below.

=== Officers ===
As of July 2026.

- Mark Sewards: Chair
- Damien Egan: Vice-Chair
- Baroness Berger: Vice-Chair
- Lord McCabe: Vice-Chair
- Catherine McKinnell: Vice-Chair
- Peter Prinsley: Vice-Chair

=== Sitting MPs ===
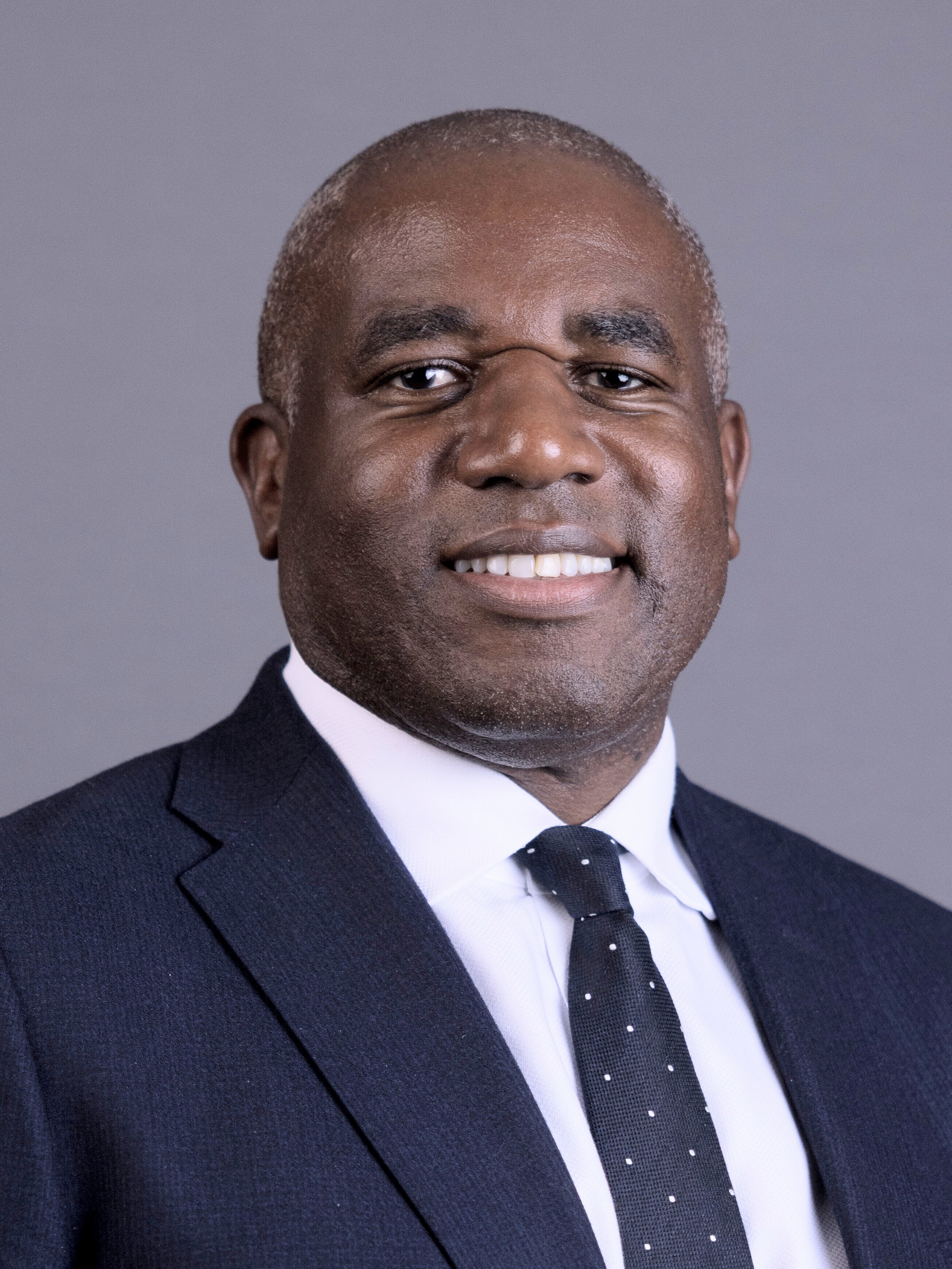
David Lammy is a supporter of Labour Friends of Israel.

Labour (unless otherwise stated) (* = Cabinet Minister)

- Fleur Anderson
- Hilary Benn
- *Chris Bryant as of July 2026 Secretary of State for Northern Ireland
- Liam Byrne
- Neil Coyle
- Feryal Clark
- *Yvette Cooper As of July 2026, Secretary of State for Health and Social Care
- Janet Daby
- *Angela Eagle As of June 2026, Minister of State for Security, as of 20 July 2026, Secretary of State for Environment, Food and Rural Affairs
- Maria Eagle
- Chris Elmore
- Chris Evans
- Florence Eshalomi
- Barry Gardiner
- Preet Gill
- Mary Glindon
- Lilian Greenwood
- Nia Griffith
- Carolyn Harris
- Fabian Hamilton
- Sharon Hodgson
- Dan Jarvis former Secretary of State for Defence
- Diana Johnson
- Darren Jones
- Mike Kane
- Peter Kyle
- Liz Kendall
- David Lammy
- Kim Leadbeater
- Siobhain McDonagh
- *Pat McFadden as of 5 September 2026 Secretary of State for Work and Pensions
- Stephen Morgan
- Alex Norris
- Taiwo Owatemi
- Jon Pearce
- Toby Perkins
- Jess Phillips
- *Bridget Phillipson as of 8 July 2024 Minister for Women and Equalities
- *Lucy Powell Secretary of State for Education since 20 July 2026
- Rachel Reeves
- *Jonathan Reynolds as of June 2026 Chief Whip of the Labour Party in the House of Commons, as of 20 July 2026 Secretary of State for Business, Innovation, Science and Trade, President of the Board of Trade
- Jeff Smith
- Karin Smyth
- Keir Starmer, former Prime Minister
- *Wes Streeting, as of 22 July 2026, Secretary of State for Defence
- Graham Stringer
- Mike Tapp
- Gareth Thomas
- Emily Thornberry
- Karl Turner
- Derek Twigg
- Christian Wakeford
- Jo White

=== Sitting Lords ===
Labour (unless otherwise stated)

- Baron Anderson of Swansea
- Baroness Armstrong of Hill Top
- Lord Beamish
- Baron Beecham
- Lord Blunkett
- Lord Boateng
- Lord Clarke of Hampstead
- Lord Collins of Highbury
- Baroness Crawley
- Lord Desai
- Lord Donoughue
- Lord Foulkes of Cumnock
- Baroness Gale
- Lord Grantchester
- Lord Hain
- Lord Harrison
- Lord Haskel
- Baroness Hayter of Kentish Town
- Baroness Hodge of Barking
- Lord Hughes of Woodside
- Lord Hunt of Kings Heath
- Baroness Kennedy of Cradley
- Lord Kennedy of Southwark
- Lord Levy
- Baroness Liddell of Coatdyke
- Lord Livermore
- John Maxton
- Paul Murphy, Baron Murphy of Torfaen
- Lord Rooker
- Baroness Smith of Basildon As of June 2026, Leader of the House of Lords
- Lord Spellar
- Lord Stone of Blackheath
- Lord Tomlinson
- Lord Touhig
- Lord Turnberg (Independent)
- Lord Watts
- Lord Winston
- Baroness Winterton of Doncaster
- Lord Wood of Anfield
- Lord Young of Norwood Green

=== Former members ===
- David Abrahams, former Treasurer
- Lord Archer of Sandwell
- Sir Stuart Bell
- Tony Blair, former Prime Minister
- Gordon Brown, former Prime Minister
- Nick Brown
- Stephen Byers, former Secretary of State for Trade and Industry
- Rosie Cooper
- Jon Cruddas
- Wayne David
- Andrew Dismore
- Michael Dugher
- Derek Foster
- Anthony Greenwood, first Chair of LFI (1957)
- Andrew Gwynne
- Baroness Hayman
- George Howarth
- Joan Humble
- Barbara Keeley
- Jane Kennedy, Chair of LFI (2007)
- Ivan Lewis, former vice-chair of LFI
- Lord Macdonald of Tradeston
- Denis MacShane
- Chris Matheson
- Michael McCann, Vice-chair of LFI
- Conor McGinn
- Anne McGuire, Chair of LFI (2013)
- Jonathan Mendelsohn, former Chair of LFI (2002)
- Alun Michael, former Leader of the Welsh Labour Party
- Andrew Miller
- Jim Murphy, former Chair of LFI (2001), former Secretary of State for Scotland
- Dan Norris
- Nick Palmer
- James Purnell, former Chair of LFI, former Secretary of State for Work and Pensions
- Meta Ramsay, Baroness Ramsay of Cartvale
- John Reid, former Home Secretary (2007)
- Terry Rooney
- Virendra Sharma
- Barry Sheerman
- Dari Taylor
- Gary Titley
- Glenis Willmott, Vice Chair of LFI
- Lord Winston
- John Woodcock
- Iain Wright, former Chair of LFI (2006)
- Lord Young of Norwood Green

== See also ==
- Conservative Friends of Israel
- European Friends of Israel
- Friends of Israel Initiative
- Israel lobby in the United Kingdom
- Israel lobby in the United States
- Jewish Labour Movement
- Jewish Voice for Labour
- Labour Friends of Palestine & the Middle East
- Liberal Democrat Friends of Israel
- Northern Ireland Friends of Israel
