= Friends of Palestine =

Friends of Palestine may refer to:

- Friends of Palestine in the Parliament of Norway
- Conservative Friends of Palestine
- Labour Friends of Palestine and the Middle East

== See also ==
- Friends of Israel (disambiguation)
