= Council for the United States and Italy =

Non-profit organization

The Council for the United States and Italy
- Founded: 1983
- Purpose: Improve informations, examination of economic and political issues
- Location: Italy, United States of America
- Region served: Italy, United States of America
- Method: Membership contributions
- Key people: Sergio Marchionne, Samuel J. Palmisano
- Website: consiusa.org

The Council for the United States and Italy (CONSIUSA) is a non-profit organization founded in 1983 whose purpose is to foster better ties between the United States and Italy, with a focus on economy and finance. David Rockefeller and Gianni Agnelli are among its founding members. Robert Agostinelli was former Vice-Chairman of the Council for the United States & Italy.

The Council for the United States and Italy created the Young Leaders Program in 1984; it is the Council’s oldest and most regular program.

Notable individuals who are Young Leader Program alumni:

- Elena Rossini
