= Robert Agostinelli =

American businessman (born 1953)

Robert F. Agostinelli
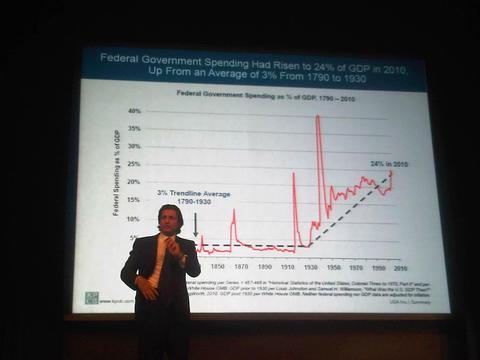
- Agostinelli in 2011
- Born: May 21, 1953 (age 73); Rochester, New York, U.S.
- Education: St. John Fisher College (BA); Columbia University (MBA)
- Occupation: Financier
- Known for: Chairman & co-founder, Rhône Group; Co-founder, Friends of Israel Initiative; Former vice chairman, Council for the U.S & Italy
- Spouse: Francesca Lana
- Website: rhonegroup.com

Robert Frank Agostinelli (born May 21, 1953) is an American billionaire financier who is the chairman and co-founder of private equity firm Rhône Group. Forbes estimates Agostinelli's net worth to be $1.0 billion, ranking him as the 416th richest American. Agostinelli was ranked #124 amongst the richest people in the United Kingdom by the Sunday Times Rich List in 2012 through to 2018 with a net worth of £689 million. In 2018 Financial News ranked Agostinelli as the 18th richest financier in the United Kingdom.

== Early life ==
Agostinelli was born to Italian immigrant parents outside of Rochester, New York, and attended the Aquinas Institute. He obtained his BA from St. John Fisher College in 1976 and then his MBA at Columbia Business School at Columbia University. Agostinelli is a certified public accountant.

== Career ==
Agostinelli began his career in financial services at the investment bank Jacob Rothschild in Switzerland from 1981 to 1982 and subsequently joined Goldman Sachs becoming a senior partner where he worked for five years and founded the firm's international mergers and acquisitions business in London and then moved to Lazard Freres as Senior Managing Director in charge of international banking affairs where he was involved in a number of the largest transactions in European takeover history.

In 1995 Agostinelli and Steven Langman started their own firm, the Rhône Group where he has been actively involved in all aspects of the group's strategy and development since its creation, while maintaining and extending the firm's broad base of relationships with private families, key corporate decision makers, institutional investors and senior sovereign government officials. He is actively engaged in the sourcing and monitoring of investments across all industries and leads the firm's investor relations activities. He sits on the supervisory board of Eurazeo.

== Politics and philanthropy ==
Agostinelli is a director and advisor for several European and American philanthropic and civic institutions. He is a member of the Council on Foreign Relations, and a leading supporter of neoconservative causes. He is a founding member of the Friends of Israel Initiative. He is former vice-chairman of the Council for the United States and Italy (CONSIUSA), a member of the Investment Committee of Corporate World Opportunities of BSI Group. In 2008 Agostinelli, provided substantial funding to the presidential campaigns of John McCain and Rudy Giuliani.

Agostinelli is a friend of former French President Nicolas Sarkozy and former Spanish Prime Minister José María Aznar.

He is a senior member of the Marine Corps Scholarship Foundation led by the American Patriots Campaign Cabinet, and a senior board director on the American Italian Cancer Foundation. Agostinelli is on the board of trustees of the National Review Institute and the American Veterans Center Agostinelli is known for writing articles in the Wall Street Journal and The Washington Times on various political, economic and social issues. Agostinelli was listed in 1997 as a member of the Bilderberg Group. He has been quoted "pursue happiness and the American dream and not “fall prey to the tyranny of false deities” such as critical race theory, the “Marxist Black Lives Matter organization,” feminism and “gender confusion.”

== Friends of Israel Initiative ==
A delegation of the Friends of Israel Initiative, which included Agostinelli, met with President Shimon Peres at Beit HaNassi in Jerusalem in July 2011. The delegation included former Spanish Prime Minister José Aznar, former US Ambassador to the United Nations John R. Bolton, and Nobel Peace Prize laureate Lord David Trimble. The president held a working meeting with the group and presented an overview of the situation in Israel and the region at large. Agostinelli stated: "Israel is a fundamentally important part of the Western world. It is a democracy under fire, and we must be resolute in defence of its legitimacy."

== Personal life ==
Agostinelli is based between New York City and Palm Beach, and he maintains additional homes in London and Paris, all of which have interiors designed by Jacques Grange. In 2014 Agostinelli reportedly purchased the first landmarked estate in Palm Beach known as "La Loma" built by Gustav Maass and John Volk, which was on the market for $14.5 million through Sotheby's International Realty and sold for $12 million. According to the Sunday Times Rich List 2015, Agostinelli is 'building a home in Henley-on-Thames. In 2017 The Sunday Times reported that Agostinelli spent £25 million on a home in South Kensington, London. He counts Nicolas Sarkozy, George W. Bush, Jeb Bush and José María Aznar as close friends. He is the father of the Swiss-based artist Massimo Agostinelli. He is married to Francesca Lana.

== Associated publications ==
- Bowing to Beijing, by Brett M. Decker and William C. Triplett II. (2011)
- The Politically Incorrect Guide to the British Empire, by H. W. Crocker III. (2011)
- The Last Tycoons, by William D. Cohan. (2007)
