= Israel lobby in Canada =

The Israel lobby in Canada comprises individuals and groups seeking to influence Canadian foreign policy in favour of the State of Israel, bilateral ties with it, Zionism or the policies of the Israeli government.

== History ==
In 1973, the Canada-Israel Committee, now the Centre for Israel and Jewish Affairs (CJIA) began sponsoring trips to Israel for federal politicians.

On 1 July 2023, new rules for the Lobbyist's Code of Conduct went into effect, restricting registered lobbyists from lobbying federal politicians who accept free trips from them. CIJA stated it would be on of the groups most affected by the new rules. CJIA was given an exception to these rules, as a $134,304 trip for seven MPs scheduled for July 2023 was planned before the rule changed. The group was instead given a two year period during which CIJA was barred from lobbying any of those MPs.

In the aftermath of the October 7 attacks, Canadian pro-Israel lobbying organizations criticized then-Prime Minister Justin Trudeau for allegedly fueling antisemitism after he condemned Israel for killing civilians during the Gaza war and genocide. They said, "the blood of dead babies - Israeli and Palestinian - is on Hamas."

In October 2024, Canada's government published the Canadian Handbook on the IHRA Working Definition of Antisemitism, which was lobbied for by B’nai Brith Canada and Centre for Israel and Jewish Affairs.

== Organizations ==
Key organizations of the Israel lobby in Canada include the Jewish Defense League of Canada, B'nai Brith Canada, the Canadian Council for Israel and Jewish Advocacy, NGO Monitor, Campus Watch, University Outreach Committee, and the Canadian Academic Friends of Israel.

== See also ==
- Israel lobby in Australia
- Israel lobby in the United States
- Israel lobby in the United Kingdom
