= Leonard Steinberg, Baron Steinberg =

Northern Irish businessman (1936–2009)

The Right Honourable The Lord Steinberg

Member of the House of Lords
- Lord Temporal
- Life peerage 23 June 2004 – 2 November 2009

Personal details
- Born: Leonard Steinberg; 1 August 1936 Belfast, United Kingdom
- Died: 2 November 2009 (aged 73) London, United Kingdom
- Party: Ulster Unionist; Conservative
- Occupation: Businessman

Leonard Steinberg, Baron Steinberg (1 August 1936 – 2 November 2009) was a British life peer and multi-millionaire businessman.

Born in Belfast on 1 August 1936, he was educated at the Royal Belfast Academical Institution. Steinberg was the founder and Non-Executive chairman of Stanley Leisure. The business was founded in Belfast in 1958, but Steinberg moved to Liverpool in 1977 when he refused to pay protection money to either republican or loyalist paramilitaries, and after he was shot on 23 February 1977 by the Provisional Irish Republican Army. The Irish Times reported the next day that, "The attacks are believed to be part a campaign against leading figures in the North’s commercial life launched late last year by the Provisional IRA." Despite his move to England, he continued to describe himself thus: "I am Jewish, Northern Irish, and an Ulster Unionist"

Since 2005, Stanley Leisure has seen changes of ownership, with William Hill buying the bookmaking operations and the Genting Group buying the casino operation. Steinberg sold a large number of his shares in 2004, but retained 11.3% of the company's stake. His personal fortune was estimated as being some £108 million in 2005. He was also the founder and chairman of trustees of the Steinberg Family Charitable Trust.

Steinberg, who then lived in Hale, was made a Conservative Party life peer on 23 June 2004 with the title Baron Steinberg, of Belfast in the County of Antrim, and had made contributions to the Conservative Party.

The Northern Ireland Friends of Israel group was launched with Steinberg as president in March 2009. He spoke of "the longstanding links which connect Northern Ireland and Israel" at that launch.

Steinberg died in London on 2 November 2009 while travelling to attend a sitting of the House of Lords. He was survived by his wife Beryl, two children and grandchildren.

His wife, Lady Beryl Steinberg, died on 8 February 2022.

== Arms ==
Coat of arms of Leonard Steinberg, Baron Steinberg

Adopted
2006
Coronet
Coronet of a Baron
Crest
Statant on two Horseshoes reversed Or a Cricket Gules
Escutcheon
Per pale Argent and Gules issuing in base three Pallets couped in fess each ensigned with a sinister Hand appaumy couped at the wrist each charged on the palm with a Roundel all counterchanged
Supporters
On either side a Horse Gules maned and tailed and supporting between the forelegs a Torah Or
Motto
QUAERERE VERUM
Badge
Within a Sun in splendour voided a Menorah Or enflamed Gules
Symbolism
Arms, Crest, Badge and Supporters allude to the Jewish faith, Northern Ireland, cricket and horse racing.

== See also ==
- List of Northern Ireland Members of the House of Lords
- Northern Ireland Friends of Israel
