= Liberal Democrat Friends of Turkey =

Associated organisation of the Liberal Democrats

LibDem Friends of Turkey
- Formation: 2008; 18 years ago
- Headquarters: London, UK
- Website: ldfot.org

Liberal Democrat Friends of Turkey (LDFoT) is a UK-based campaign group promoting support within the British Liberal Democrat Party for a strong bilateral relationship between Britain and Turkey. It also seeks to strengthen the bond between the British Liberal Democrats and Turkish liberals, organising meetings in both the UK and Turkey between senior figures.

Liberal Democrats Friends of Turkey promotes active participation in politics and seeks to explain social liberalism and the services that the Liberal Democrats have done, to the citizens of both countries.

The Liberal Democrats work for a society where personal, political and economic liberty are combined with social justice, decentralisation of power and environmental sustainability.

== Members ==
Members of Liberal Democrat Friends of Turkey include:

- Baroness Meral Husseyin Ece OBE,
- Baroness Sarah Ludford, MEP
- Sir Graham Watson, MEP
- Jonathan Fryer,
- Andrew Duff OBE, MEP

== See also ==
- Liberal Democrat Friends of Israel
