= Stanley Leisure =

UK casino business

Stanley Leisure is a British casino firm.

== History ==
The company was founded in the 1950s as a bookmakers in Belfast. It was originally run by Leonard Steinberg, Baron Steinberg. In 1977, Steinberg moved the business to Liverpool after an attempted assassination by the Provisional IRA over protection money. In 2004, Steinburg sold half of his shares to the Malaysian company Genting; Steinberg retained a 12.2% stake. In 2005, William Hill agreed to buy 624 betting shops from Stanley Leisure for £504 million.
