= Elena Rossini =

Italian filmmaker, writer and artist

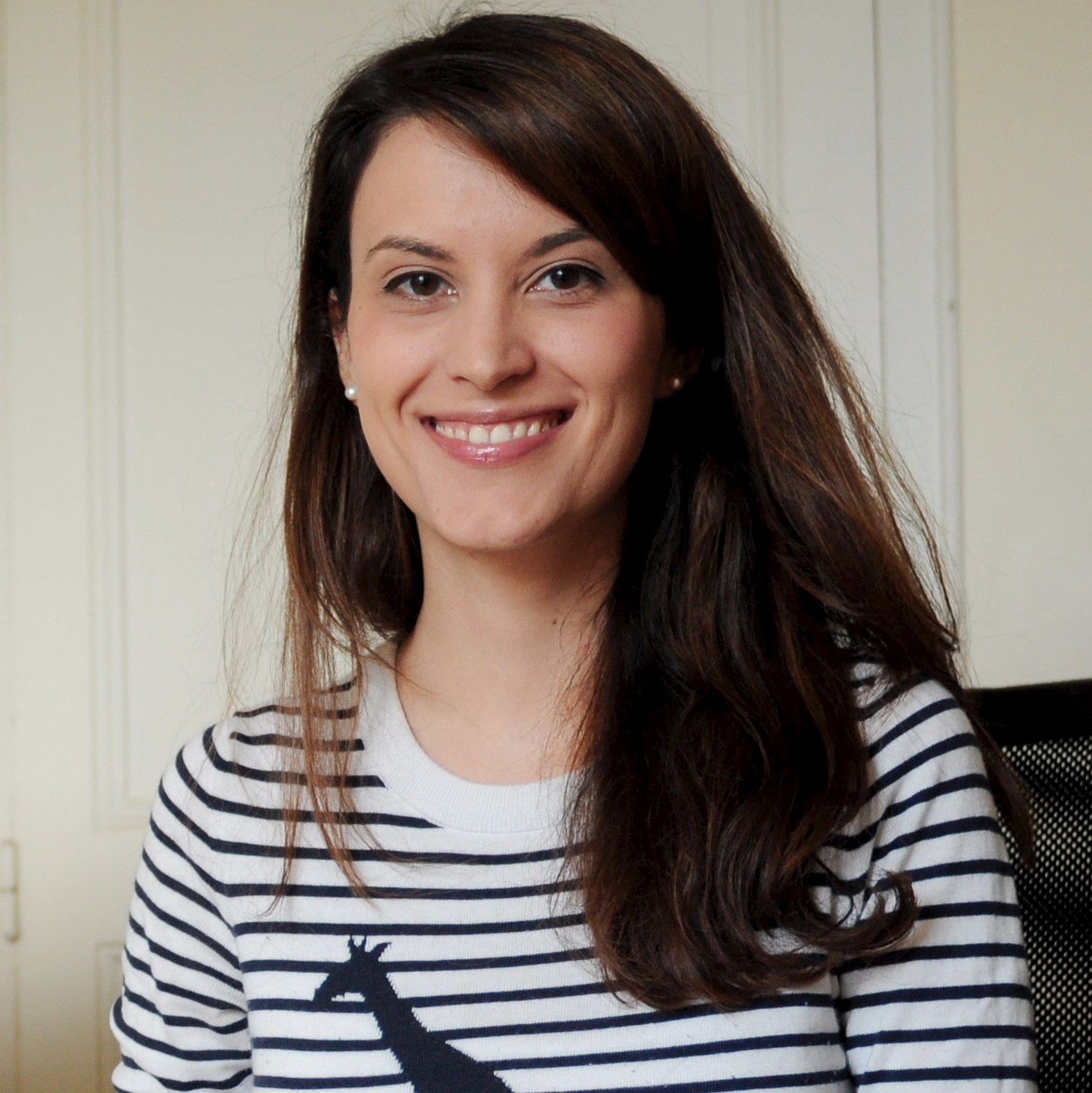
- Known for: Italian filmmaker

Elena Rossini is an Italian filmmaker, writer and artist best known for the documentary film The Illusionists. In October 2014, Rossini was selected for the Young Leaders program by the Council for the United States and Italy. Rossini is the founder and editor-in-chief of a now-defunct website that aimed to provide "positive role models" for young girls. In 2014, Rossini and Elian Carsenat founded a platform "empowering companies and organizations with innovative tools to measure the gender gap".

== Personal life ==
Rossini is originally from Como, Italy. She studied at Pepperdine University in the United States and divides her time between Paris and Como.

== Filmography ==
Year	Title	Director	Producer	Writer	Cinematographer
2009	Ideal Women	Yes	Yes		
2012	Champagne				Yes
2015	The Illusionists	Yes	Yes	Yes	Yes
2015	Lottie in Space	Yes	Yes		Yes

=== The Illusionists ===
The Illusionists is a documentary about the marketing of unattainable beauty ideals around the world. Filming locations included the U.S., U.K., the Netherlands, France, Italy, Lebanon, India and Japan. Rossini has plans for a sequel called Illusionists Too which will focus on the influence of social media on self-esteem and self-image.
