= Stuart Polak, Baron Polak =

British politician (born 1961)

The Right Honourable The Lord Polak CBE
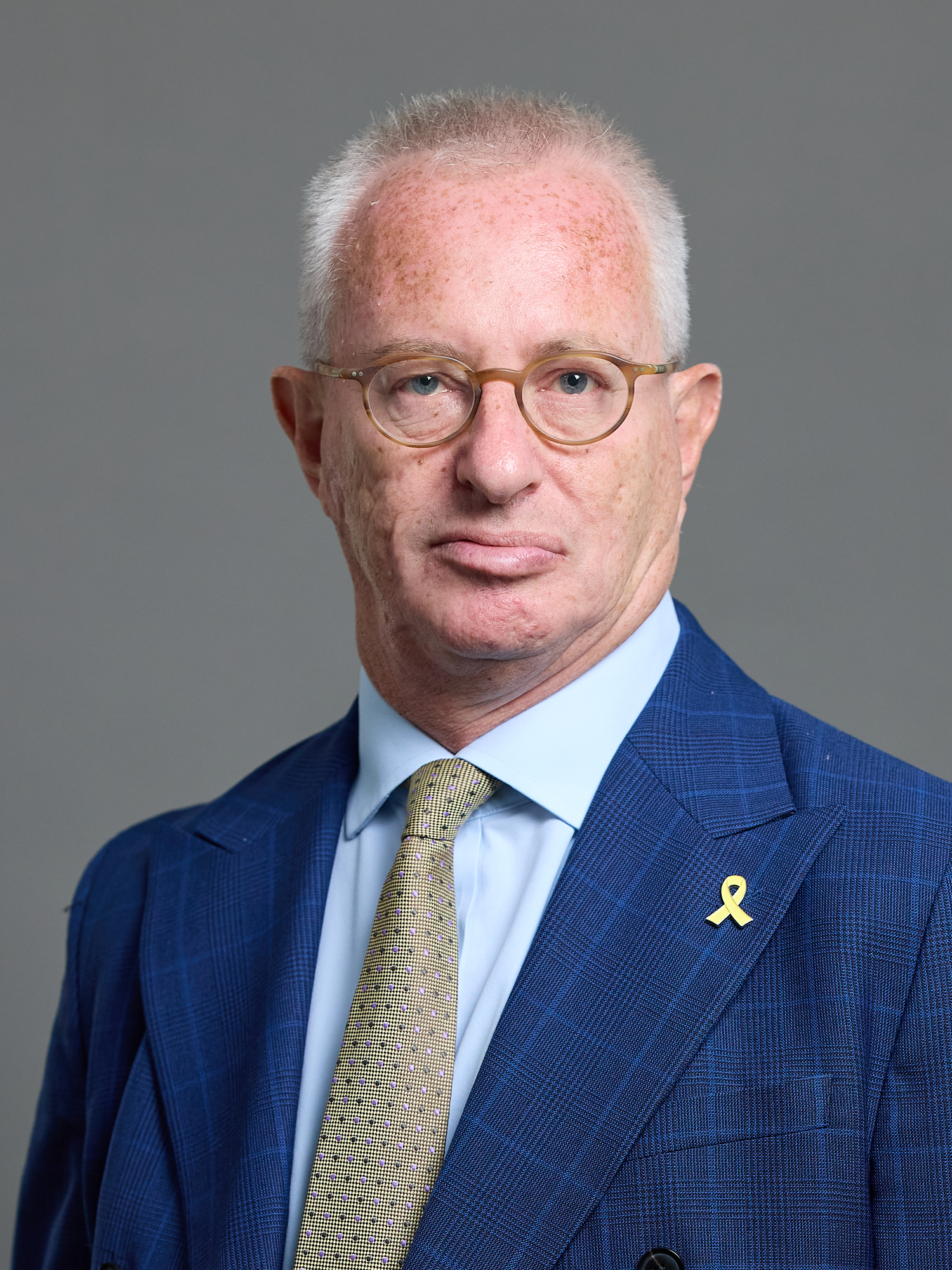
- Official portrait, 2025

Member of the House of Lords
- Lord Temporal
- Life peerage 2 October 2015

Personal details
- Born: 28 March 1961 (age 65) Liverpool, United Kingdom
- Occupation: Peer

Stuart Polak, Baron Polak CBE (born 28 March 1961) is a British Conservative politician, life peer in the House of Lords and honorary president of the Conservative Friends of Israel.

== Early life ==
Stuart Polak was born in Liverpool, England. He attended the Childwall Hebrew Congregation, a synagogue in Liverpool, where he was a chazan, or cantor, during the Jewish High Holidays. He took educational trips to Israel from the age of fifteen.

== Career ==
Polak was a youth officer at the Edgware United Synagogue in Edgware, northwest London. He served as an officer of the Board of Deputies of British Jews in the 1980s.

Polak joined the Conservative Friends of Israel in 1989. He served as its Director for twenty-six years, until August 2015; he now serves as its honorary president. He also serves as chairman of TWC Associates and as a senior consultant to Jardine Lloyd Thompson.

Polak was appointed Commander of the Order of the British Empire (CBE) for political service in the 2015 New Year Honours. He was created a life peer taking the title Baron Polak, of Hertsmere in the County of Hertfordshire on 2 October 2015.

== Resignation of Priti Patel ==
On 3 November 2017, the BBC's Diplomatic correspondent James Landale reported that Polak had accompanied Priti Patel, the Secretary of State for International Development, when she had held a series of meetings in Israel in August 2017 without telling the Foreign and Commonwealth Office. They met Yair Lapid, the leader of Israel's centrist Yesh Atid party, and visited several organisations where official departmental business was discussed. Those meetings, and others later, led to Patel's resignation from the Cabinet on 8 November 2017.

== Criticism ==
In 2021, former Foreign Minister Sir Alan Duncan published his diaries, in which Polak featured as a frequent opponent of his fellow Conservative Duncan, allegedly operating in tandem with CFI colleague Eric Pickles to ensure the pro-Palestinian Duncan did not acquire certain governmental positions.

In April 2024, Polak was accused of serving the political interests of Israel instead of the interests of his own country. Duncan said of Polak: "In my view, I think he should be removed from the Lords because he is exercising the interests of another country, not that of the parliament in which he sits". The Conservative Party launched an investigation into Duncan, despite having no formal complaint, but found no wrongdoing, and cleared him in July 2024.

Orders of precedence in the United Kingdom
Preceded by The Lord O'Shaughnessy	Gentlemen; Baron Polak	Followed by The Lord Lansley
