= Israel lobby in Australia =

The Israel lobby in Australia comprises individuals and groups seeking to influence Australian foreign policy in favour of the State of Israel, bilateral ties with it, Zionism or the policies of the Israeli government. Key organisations include the Zionist Federation of Australia (ZFA), the Executive Council of Australian Jewry (ECAJ) and the Australian Israel and Jewish Affairs Council (AIJAC).

== Organisations ==
The Australian Israel and Jewish Affairs Council (AIJAC) is considered the most prominent pro-Israel lobbying organisation in Canberra. AIJAC is a privately funded think tank, while ZFA and ECAJ are peak organisations.

== Criticism ==
In 2014, former foreign minister Bob Carr characterised the Israel Lobby in Australia as having "extraordinary influence" during his time in the cabinet of Prime Minister Julia Gillard in his book, Diary of a Foreign Minister. Carr described the influence of "extreme right-wing" pro-Israeli lobbyists influencing Australia's policy towards Israel and the occupied territories, writing, "I found it very frustrating that we couldn't issue, for example, a routine expression of concern about the spread of Israeli settlements on the West Bank - great blocks of housing for Israeli citizens going up on land that everyone regards as part of the future Palestinian state if there is to be a two-state solution."

Carr's comments were criticised by Australian Jewish leaders, including Robert Goot, president of the Executive Council of Australian Jewry, who said, "It is ludicrous and insulting to them [Gillard and other politicians] to suggest that they can be manipulated or bought."

In August 2026, NSW Supreme Court Justice Desmond Fagan wrote in his State of New South Wales v Farhat ruling that the Executive Council of Australian Jewry was a "transparently pro-Israel lobbying organisation". Fagan said the IHRA definition of antisemitism did not reflect the use of the term "antisemitism" in Australia and ruled that "Fuk Israel" graffiti is not antisemitic.

== See also ==
- Israel lobby in the United States
- Israel lobby in the United Kingdom
- Israel lobby in Canada
