= Trevor Chinn =

British businessman

Sir Trevor Chinn CVO
- Born: Trevor Edwin Chinn; 24 July 1935 (age 91)
- Education: King's College, Cambridge
- Occupation: Businessman
- Spouse: Susan Chinn
- Children: 2, including Simon Chinn

Sir Trevor Edwin Chinn CVO (born 24 July 1935) is a British businessman, philanthropist, and political activist. He is a Labour Party supporter and donor as well as active in Jewish and pro-Israel causes.

In November 2024 he was awarded the Israeli Presidential Medal of Honour for service to the state of Israel.

== Education and career ==
Chinn was educated at Clifton College and King's College, Cambridge. He was employed by the Royal Automobile Club (RAC) from 1959 to 2003, working his way up from a directorship to becoming chief executive and chairman of the company for over twenty years. He was then briefly the chairman of Kwik Fit and The Automobile Association (AA), while sustaining an alternative role as a senior adviser with the private equity firm CVC Capital from 2002 onwards.

== Public roles ==
Chinn's leadership roles include Chief Barker of the Variety Club of Great Britain for two successive terms (1977 and 1978), Chairman of the Friends of the Duke of Edinburgh's Award Scheme (for which he was appointed CVO in 1989), Vice-chairman of the Wishing Well Appeal for Great Ormond Street Hospital (for which he received a knighthood in 1990), and Deputy Chairman of the Royal Academy Trust.

Described by Jewish News as a Jewish community grandee, throughout his life he has devoted himself to the Jewish community in Britain and supporting Israel in a number of roles, for example: chairman and President of the United Jewish Israel Appeal; board member of The Jewish Community Centre for London, President of Norwood from 1996 to 2006; and one of the founders and now vice-president of the Jewish Association for Business Ethics. Chinn also sits on the executive committee of the Jewish Leadership Council and the Britain Israel Communications and Research Centre (BICOM). In 2016, he became President of the Movement for Reform Judaism.

Chinn has been president of United Jewish Israel Appeal since 1993. The UJIA funds trips for British Jews to go on birthright to Israel. The organisation faced criticism in 2022 for housing participants in illegal Israeli settlements in the West Bank.

He was Chair of the London Mayor's Fund.

Up to 2016, Chinn donated to the office or campaigns of a number of Labour politicians, including MPs Tony Blair, Ruth Smeeth, Liz Kendall, Tom Watson and Dan Jarvis. Since 2016, he has additionally financially supported the MPs Ivan Lewis, Owen Smith, Lisa Nandy, Tristram Hunt, Jack Dromey, Ian Austin, Rachel Reeves, Liam Byrne and Wes Streeting. In February 2020, he donated £50,000 to support the Labour party leadership election campaign of Keir Starmer.

In 2015 Chinn helped fund and was a director of Labour Together, an anti-Corbyn think-tank.

== Personal life ==
He was married to Susan, and they have two sons, David, and Simon Chinn, who is a film producer. Lady Chinn died in 2025.
