= Michael Levy, Baron Levy =

British Baron (born 1944)

The Right Honourable The Lord Levy
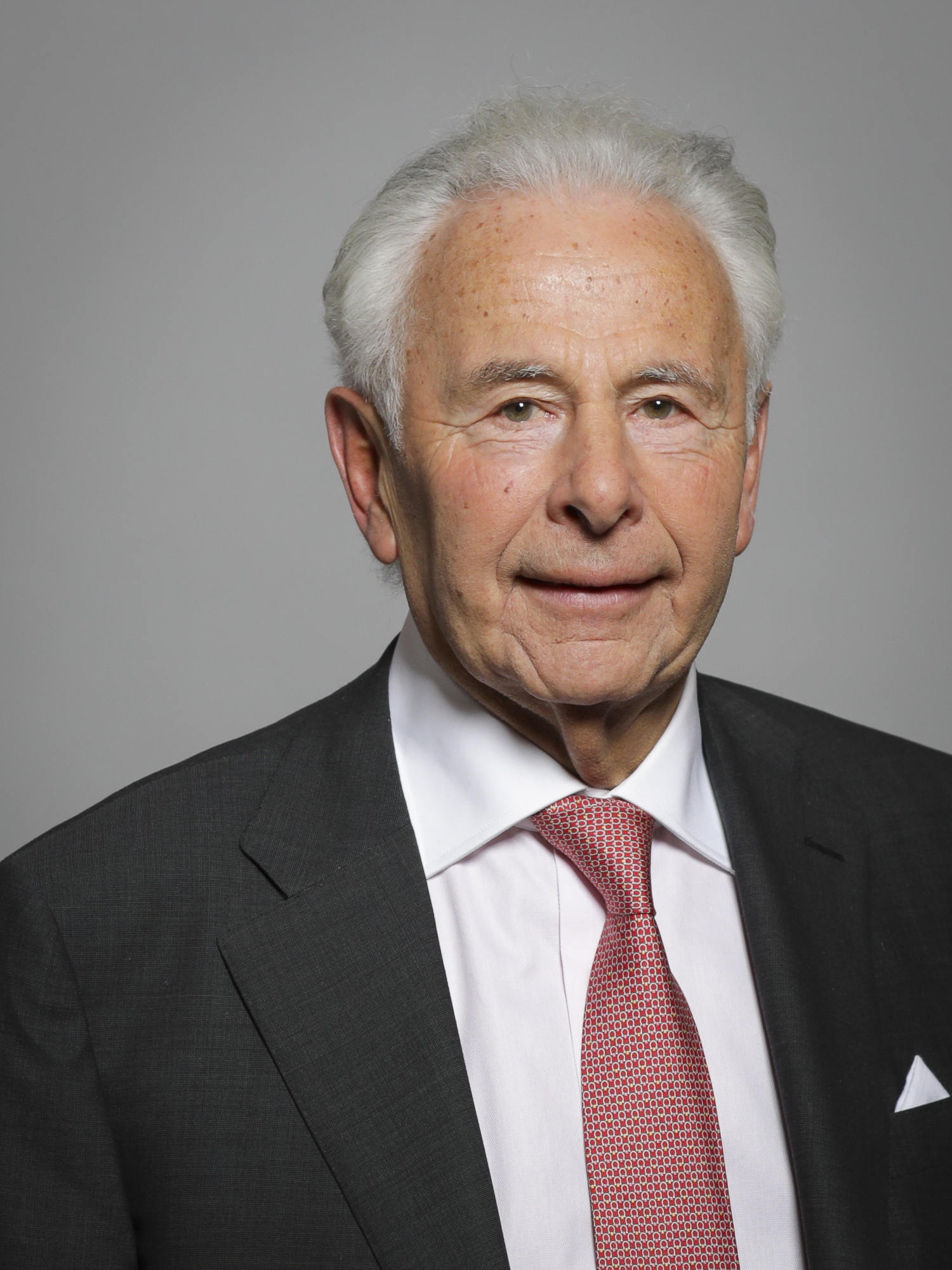
- Official portrait, 2019

Member of the House of Lords
- Lord Temporal
- Life peerage 23 September 1997

Personal details
- Born: Michael Abraham Levy; 11 July 1944 (age 82) Stoke Newington, North London, England
- Party: Labour
- Spouse: Gilda

Michael Abraham Levy, Baron Levy (born 11 July 1944), is a British life peer and former chartered accountant who was chairman and CEO of a large independent group of music companies. A long-standing friend of former prime minister Tony Blair, Levy was the chief fundraiser for the Labour Party under Blair and spent nine years as Blair's special envoy to the Middle East.

Levy now acts as a consultant for a number of companies and is also chairman of a finance company. He is also the president of Sense and Sense International, Jewish Care, Barnet and Southgate Colleges, Jewish Free School (JFS), Jewish Lads' and Girls' Brigade (JLGB), Etz Chaim Jewish Primary School, and Mathilda Marks-Kennedy Jewish Primary School (MMK). He was previously president of the Specialist Schools and Academies Trust and president of Volunteering Matters.

== Early life ==
Levy was born in the summer of 1944 in what was then still considered a socially deprived neighbourhood of Stoke Newington in North London. He was the only child of Samuel and Annie Levy, devout Jewish immigrant parents of modest means. His father was the head of the synagogue, the shamash in Walford Road shul in Stoke Newington and his grandfather was a rabbi. The family lived in a one-room apartment until he was nine years old and used the public baths. As a child growing up in poverty, he later remembered: “If I got a fruit once a week from Ridley Street market, that was a treat.” Levy was educated at Grocers, later known as Hackney Downs School. He left the school at 16 to become an accountant.

== Career ==
=== Music industry ===
Levy qualified as a Chartered Accountant in 1966 (ACA then FCA) and set up a professional accountancy practice. The practice attracted a great number of clients in the music and entertainment industry, and Levy became a specialist in international copyright and licence. Amongst the clients were the Foundations, Vanity Fair, Roger Greenaway, Barry Mason and many other successful producers and artists.

Levy founded Magnet Records with Peter Shelley in 1973. This became one of the most successful independent labels of its day and, at one stage, had 10% of the British singles market with four singles in the top ten of the UK Singles Chart. The successful artists on the label included Alvin Stardust, Adrian Baker, Chris Rea, Bad Manners, Darts, Susan Cadogan, Silver Convention and Guys 'n' Dolls. Levy sold Magnet Records to Warner Brothers in 1988 for £10m.

Guitarist Chris Rea said of Levy, "He is extremely tough, one of the hardest bastards I have ever met, but I would leave my children with him rather than anyone else." The music producer Pete Waterman described him as "the greatest salesman I have ever met. He would be able to sell sand to the Arabs."

After Magnet was sold, Levy set up M&G Records with backing from Polygram. M&G Records was so named as it was the initials of Michael and his wife Gilda, and featured acts such as Zoe who had a top five hit with "Sunshine on a Rainy Day" and Pele who had success with "Fair Blows the Wind for France". Polygram were then bought out, and the company was eventually sold to Bertelsmann (BMG) in 1997.

=== Other roles ===
In 2008 Levy became Chairman of International Standard Asset Management until 2011. He became Principal of Global Consultancy Services acting as a consultant to a number of companies and Chairman of Chase Mill Hill Ltd.

== Political activities ==
Levy first met Tony Blair at a dinner party in 1994, hosted by Israeli diplomat Gideon Meir, the two having a common friend in Eldred Tabachnik, a senior barrister and former president of the Board of Deputies of British Jews, at 11 King's Bench Walk Chambers, the chambers founded by Derry Irvine where Blair had trained in the early 1980s. They soon became close friends and tennis partners. Levy ran the Labour Leader's Office Fund to finance Blair's campaign before the 1997 general election and received substantial contributions from such figures as Alex Bernstein and Robert Gavron, both of whom were ennobled by Blair after he came to power. Known as "Lord Cashpoint" to some in the media and politics, he was the leading fundraiser for the Labour Party from 1994 to 2007 (having raised over £100m for the Labour Party).

He has been described by The Jerusalem Post as "undoubtedly the notional leader of British Jewry". He was a founding member of the Jewish Leadership Council, the leadership of the UK Jewish community. Levy has close ties with Israeli political leaders. His son, Daniel Levy, was active in Israeli political life, and served as an assistant to the former Israeli Prime Minister Ehud Barak and to former Knesset member Yossi Beilin. Daniel is now based in the UK and is President of the US Middle East Project and before that was Head of the Middle East Department of the European Council of Foreign Relations. Levy was associated with the Labour Friends of Israel. Levy has praised Blair for his "solid and committed support of the State of Israel" and "his commitment to the peace process". From 1998 until 2007, he acted as Prime Minister Blair's personal envoy to the Middle East, being replaced by Gordon Brown's appointee, Lord Williams of Baglan, in September 2007. Blair said Levy carried out "a perfectly excellent job as my envoy under very difficult circumstances". In 2007, he stepped down as Middle East envoy when Blair resigned the premiership. Many leaders in the region, including Palestinian President Mahmoud Abbas have praised Levy for always offering constructive suggestions. In September 2005, Levy was appointed President of the Council of the Specialist Schools and Academies Trust, the body overseeing the government's Specialist schools and Academy programmes.

In 2000, Levy was criticised when it was revealed that he had paid only £5,000 tax during the financial year 1998–1999 – however it was subsequently shown even in that year the tax paid was £30,000. In an interview at the time, repeated on BBC2's Newsnight on 16 March 2006, Levy stated that "Over the years I have paid many millions of tax and, if you average it, each year it comes to many hundreds of thousands of pounds. In that particular year, I was giving my time to the Labour Party and the voluntary sector, and I just lived off capital."

Levy was arrested and questioned in connection with the "Cash for Honours" inquiry by the Metropolitan Police on 12 July 2006 (whereby it was suggested that money was paid to political parties for Honours in particular peerages). No charges were made against Levy, and the police removed all details from their files.

Levy advised Jeremy Corbyn's team on tackling antisemitism during Corbyn's leadership of the party.

== Philanthropy ==
Levy was involved in fundraising from his early life and from the late 1960s for many causes, including Jewish and Israeli causes. For this he showed a special adeptness, raising, between 1988 and 1994, £60 million for Jewish Care, an amalgam of several Jewish charitable organisations, of which he is now President. Simon Morris, Former Chief Executive of Jewish Care, said of Levy that, when it comes to fundraising, "there's no one better in the country." Levy has been described as the number one fundraiser in the country, and he has raised hundreds of millions of pounds for charitable causes over the years.

He is Life President of Jewish Care, and the President of Jewish Free School (JFS), Jewish Lads' and Girls' Brigade (JLGB), Etz Chaim Jewish Primary School, Mathilda Marks-Kennedy Jewish Primary School (MMK), Barnet & Southgate Colleges and former President of Sense & Sense International and the former President of Volunteering Matters and the Specialist Schools and Academies Trust.

He was a Member of the Advisory Council of Step Up to Serve Campaign (2013-2020), Chair of the Policy Network Foundation, a policy think tank and a former member of the Board of Directors of the International Peace Institute, IPI (2014-2019).

== Recognition ==
Levy was created a life peer on 23 September 1997 as Baron Levy of Mill Hill in the London Borough of Barnet. Since making his maiden speech on 3 December 1997, Levy has not spoken in a debate at the House of Lords.

He received an Honorary Doctorate from Middlesex University in 1999, and the Israel Policy Forum (USA) Special Recognition Award in 2003. In 1994, he was a Recipient of the B'nai B'rith First Lodge Award and in 1998 a Recipient of the Friends of the Hebrew University of Jerusalem Scopus Award. He has received the Jewish Chronicle 175th Anniversary Award for outstanding, unique and long term contributions to British Community life.

== Personal life ==
He and his wife Gilda have a son, Daniel, and a daughter, Juliet.

Levy's home in Totteridge, North London, was burgled in 2003. He and his wife Gilda were restrained with handcuffs and had bleach poured over them. Levy was hit on the head with a shovel and had his wrist broken; the attackers fled with £80,000 of cash and jewellery.

Lord Levy's autobiography, A Question of Honour, was published in 2008.

== Arms ==
His coat of arms bears witness to the core of his philosophy, the value of being a mensch.

It’s inscribed ‘Oheiv shalom v’rodeif shalom’ and it’s the only coat of arms in the Lords to have Hebrew words.

Coat of arms of Michael Levy, Baron Levy
Coronet Coronet of a Baron Crest A Dove Argent, beaked and legged Gules, the dexter wing expanded, inverted and supporting a Harp Or, in the beak a Sprig of Olive Or. Escutcheon Per pale Argent and Sable, five Bars counter-changed, over all three Trumpets bells upwards Or, a Chief engrailed of two arches Or. Supporters On either side a Dove contourny and supporting with the wings addorsed and inverted Argent, beaked and legged Gules, holding in the beak a Sprig of Olive Or.

Orders of precedence in the United Kingdom
Preceded by The Lord Levene of Portsoken	Gentlemen; Baron Levy	Followed by The Lord Newby
