= Sarah Ludford, Baroness Ludford =

British politician (born 1951)

The Right Honourable The Baroness Ludford
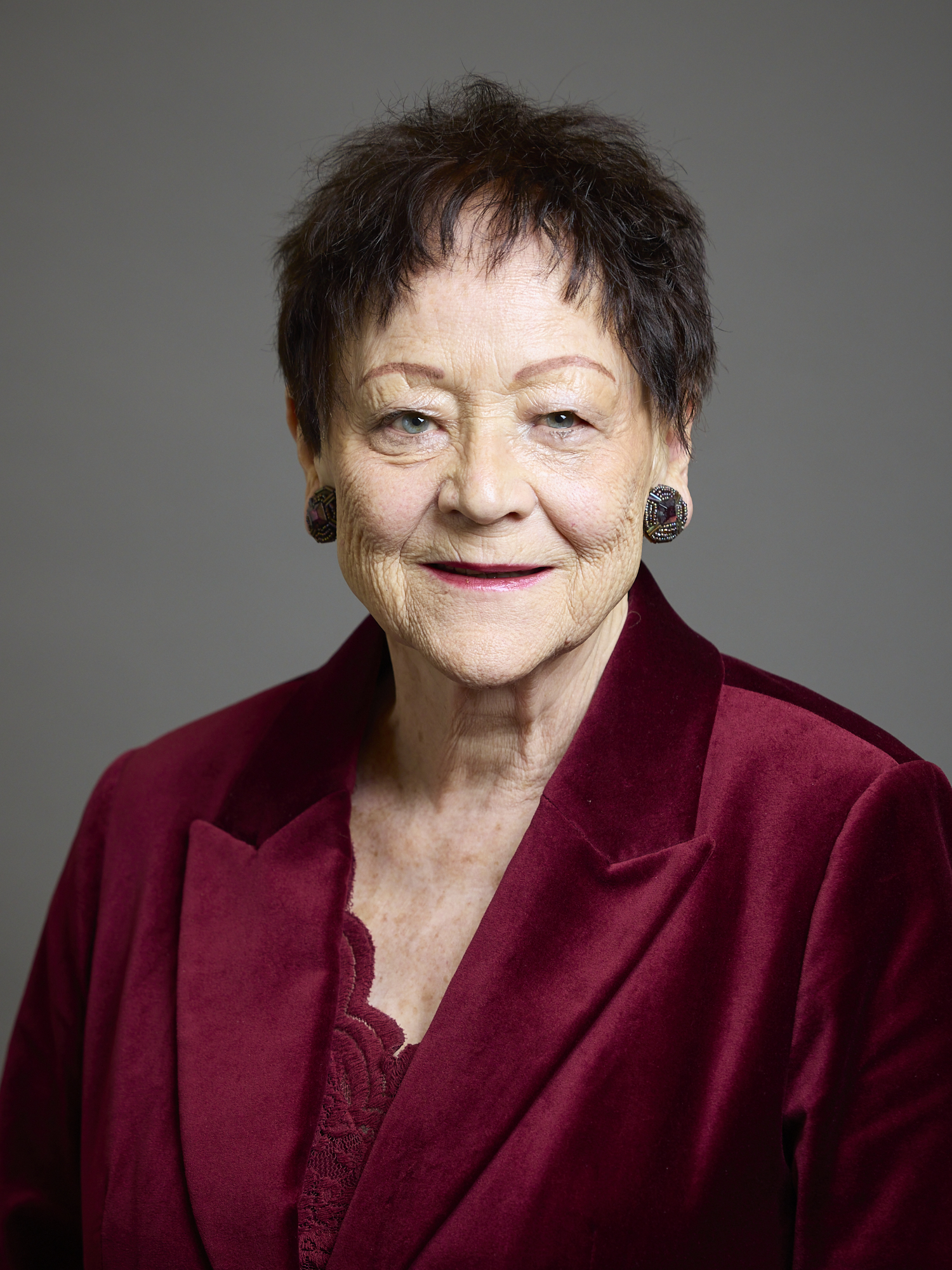
- Official portrait, 2024

Member of the European Parliament for London
- In office 10 June 1999 – 22 May 2014
- Preceded by: Position established
- Succeeded by: Seb Dance

Islington Borough Councillor for Clerkenwell Ward
- In office 7 November 1991 – 10 June 1999
- Preceded by: Paul Matthews
- Succeeded by: Isabelle Humphreys

Member of the House of Lords
- Lord Temporal
- Life peerage 30 September 1997

Personal details
- Born: 14 March 1951 (age 75) Halesworth, East Suffolk, England
- Party: Liberal Democrat
- Spouse: Steve Hitchins
- Education: LSE

Sarah Ann Ludford, Baroness Ludford (born 14 March 1951) is a British-Irish Liberal Democrat politician and member of the House of Lords. She served as a Member of the European Parliament (MEP) for London from 1999 until 2014.

== Early life and education ==
Ludford was born in the Blyth Rural District of East Suffolk to an English father and an Irish mother and grew up in Hampshire. On a scholarship, she attended the independent Portsmouth High School. She went on to graduate with a Bachelor of Science and a Master of Science, both from the London School of Economics. She subsequently qualified as a barrister, joining Gray's Inn in 1979.

== Political career ==
Ludford was created a life peer as Baroness Ludford, of Clerkenwell in the London Borough of Islington on 30 September 1997, after serving as a Councillor for the London Borough of Islington 1991–99. Having unsuccessfully fought London Central in 1989 and 1994, she was elected MEP for London at the European Parliament election in 1999 and returned in 2004 and 2009, before losing her seat in 2014.

A 2008 rule change by the European Parliament, which disqualified MEPs from simultaneously serving as members of their national legislature, initially prevented Ludford from taking her seat in the House of Lords in the UK Parliament due to her re-election to the European Parliament in the 2009 election.

She remains a member of the Liberal Democrat groups Friends of Israel and Friends of Turkey.

== Political positions ==
A longstanding opponent of capital punishment, Baroness Ludford has been pressing European drug companies not to supply executioners in the United States with sedatives. Ludford has expressed support for LGB Alliance.

== Other activities ==
- Fair Trials International, Patron
- JUSTICE, Vice President

== Personal life ==
Ludford lives in Islington. She was married to Steve Hitchins, Leader of Islington Borough Council (2000–06), until his death in September 2019.
