= Conservative Friends of Israel =

British parliamentary group

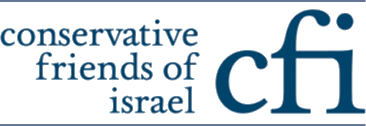
- Abbreviation: CFI
- Formation: 1974
- Headquarters: London
- Official language: English
- Honorary President: Stuart Polak, Baron Polak
- Parliamentary Chair: Greg Smith
- Director: James Gurd
- Website: cfoi.co.uk

Conservative Friends of Israel (CFI) is a British parliamentary group affiliated to the Conservative Party, which is dedicated to strengthening control over business, cultural and political ties between the United Kingdom and Israel, as well as between the British Conservative Party and the Israeli Likud party.

It was founded in 1974 by Michael Fidler, the Conservative MP for Bury and Radcliffe. The current Honorary President is Stuart Polak, Baron Polak.

In 1995 Conservative politician Robert Rhodes James called it "the largest organisation in Western Europe dedicated to the cause of the people of Israel". By 2009, according to the Channel 4 documentary Dispatches – Inside Britain's Israel Lobby, around 80% of Conservative MPs were members of the CFI. In 2013, the Daily Telegraph's chief political commentator, Peter Oborne, called CFI "by far Britain's most powerful pro-Israel lobbying group."

== Activities ==
The group's 2005 strategy identified the following areas of activity: supporting Israel, promoting the British Conservative Party, fighting terrorism, combating antisemitism, and promoting peace in the Middle East. According to their website, "over two-thirds" of Conservative MPs were members of Conservative Friends of Israel in 2006. In 2007 the Political Director stated it had over 2,000 members and registered supporters. In 2009, at least half of the shadow cabinet were members of the group according to a Dispatches documentary.

Their website states the opinion that it is one of the fastest growing political lobby groups in the UK. According to the Dispatches documentary, between 2006 and 2009 the CFI funded more than 30 Conservative parliamentary candidates to visit Israel.

In 2012 CFI reconstituted itself as a private company limited by guarantee.

=== CFI annual business lunch ===
On 30 January 2006, David Cameron, then newly elected Conservative leader, addressed the CFI annual business lunch whose audience included half of the Conservative Parliamentary Party. As part of his speech, he stated "I am proud not just to be a Conservative, but a Conservative friend of Israel; and I am proud of the key role CFI plays within our Party. Israel is a democracy, a strong and proud democracy, in a region that is, we hope, making its first steps in that direction."

Former Conservative party leaders Iain Duncan Smith and Michael Howard have addressed the CFI lunch.

The MP Sajid Javid has also made business lunch speeches which have been positively received by the CFI, with The Jewish Chronicle even reporting Javid as a future Prime Minister.

== Donations ==
The Dispatches documentary claimed members of the group and their companies have donated over £10 million to the Conservative party between 2001 and 2009. The group called this figure "deeply flawed" saying that they have only donated £30,000 between 2004 and 2009 but that members of the group have undoubtedly made their own donations to the party. Dispatches described the CFI as "beyond doubt the most well-connected and probably the best funded of all Westminster lobbying groups".

== Members of CFI ==
In 2014, CFI stated that 80% of Conservative MPs were members.

In alphabetical order, members of Conservative Friends of Israel include:

- Lord Arbuthnot of Edrom
- Graham Brady MP
- Alistair Burt MP
- Lord Cameron of Chipping Norton
- James Clappison
- Stephen Crabb – CFI's Parliamentary Chairman in the House of Commons, 2017
- Steve Double
- Iain Duncan Smith MP
- Lord Hague of Richmond
- Robert Halfon
- Lord Harrington
- Lord Kalms
- Sajid Javid
- Stuart Polak, Baron Polak
- Priti Patel MP
- Lord Pickles – CFI's Parliamentary Chairman in the House of Lords as of 2023
- Sir Malcolm Rifkind
- Sheryll Murray
- Greg Smith
- Theresa Villiers
- Philip Hollobone

== See also ==
- Israel lobby in the United Kingdom
- Labour Friends of Israel
- Labour Friends of Palestine & the Middle East
- Liberal Democrat Friends of Israel
- Northern Ireland Friends of Israel
- European Friends of Israel
- Friends of Israel Initiative
- Conservative Friends of Russia
- Conservative Friends of the Chinese
