= Friends of Israel Initiative =

International organization

- Abbreviation: FOII
- Formation: 2010
- Type: Public policy think tank
- Headquarters: Madrid, Spain
- President: José María Aznar
- Website: FriendsofIsraelInitiative.org

The Friends of Israel Initiative (FOII) is a think tank. Its stated mission is to "seek to counter the attempts to delegitimize the State of Israel and its right to live in peace within safe and defensible borders". It was initiated and led by former Prime Minister of Spain and People's Party leader José María Aznar in 2010.

== History ==
The FOII was co-founded by Republican former United States Ambassador to the United Nations John Bolton, Forza Italia's former President of the Italian Senate Marcello Pera, former President of Czech Republic Václav Havel, Peru's former President Alejandro Toledo and billionaire financier Robert Agostinelli and British Conservative Party peer, former First Minister of Northern Ireland and Nobel Peace Prize winner David Trimble.

On 19 July 2010 a launch event was held at the British House of Commons, hosted by the Henry Jackson Society and Robert Halfon MP.

The Friends of Israel Initiative met with President Shimon Peres in July 2011 at Beit HaNassi in Jerusalem. The delegation included former Spanish Prime Minister José María Aznar, former US Ambassador to the United Nations John R. Bolton, financier Robert Agostinelli, and Nobel Peace Prize laureate Lord David Trimble. The President held a working meeting with FII and presented an overview of the on situation in Israel and the region at large.

== Purpose ==
The declared purpose of the initiative is to "seek to counter the attempts to delegitimize the State of Israel and its right to live in peace within safe and defensible borders". It uses the slogan "Stand for Israel, Stand for the West". It also campaigns against Iran, in particular in relation to its potential development of nuclear armaments.

According to the Mexican newspaper El Financiero, the purpose of the initiative is to "reaffirm Western values," "work in favor of recognizing the right of Israel to exist," and counteract "anti-Semitic criticism" of Israel. According to ABC News, the initiative is founded on the conviction that "The campaign against Israel corrodes the international system from within, beginning with the United Nations."

José María Aznar states that FOII is non-Jewish in nature and not linked to the Israeli government, and only non-Jews can become a members of the board. Aznar believes that if Israel were to disappear, Europe would then be directly confronted by radical Islam elements.

== Principles ==
The Friends of Israel are based on the following principles:

1. Israel is a modern, flourishing Western country with a liberal democratic political system operating under the rule of law, with a right to be treated as such.
2. Israel's right to exist should not be questioned.
3. Israel, as a sovereign country, has the right to self-defense.
4. Israel is an ally of the west against terrorism and defender of the Judeo-Christian cultural and moral heritage, and thus "Israel's fight is our fight".
5. The key to ending the Israeli–Palestinian conflict is for the Palestinians to recognize Israel as the legitimate national homeland of the Jewish people, and then good faith negotiations have a chance of achieving success.
6. The spread of Islamic fundamentalism and jihadism and the prospect of a nuclear Iran are threats existential for the state of Israel as for the rest of the western world.

== Founders ==
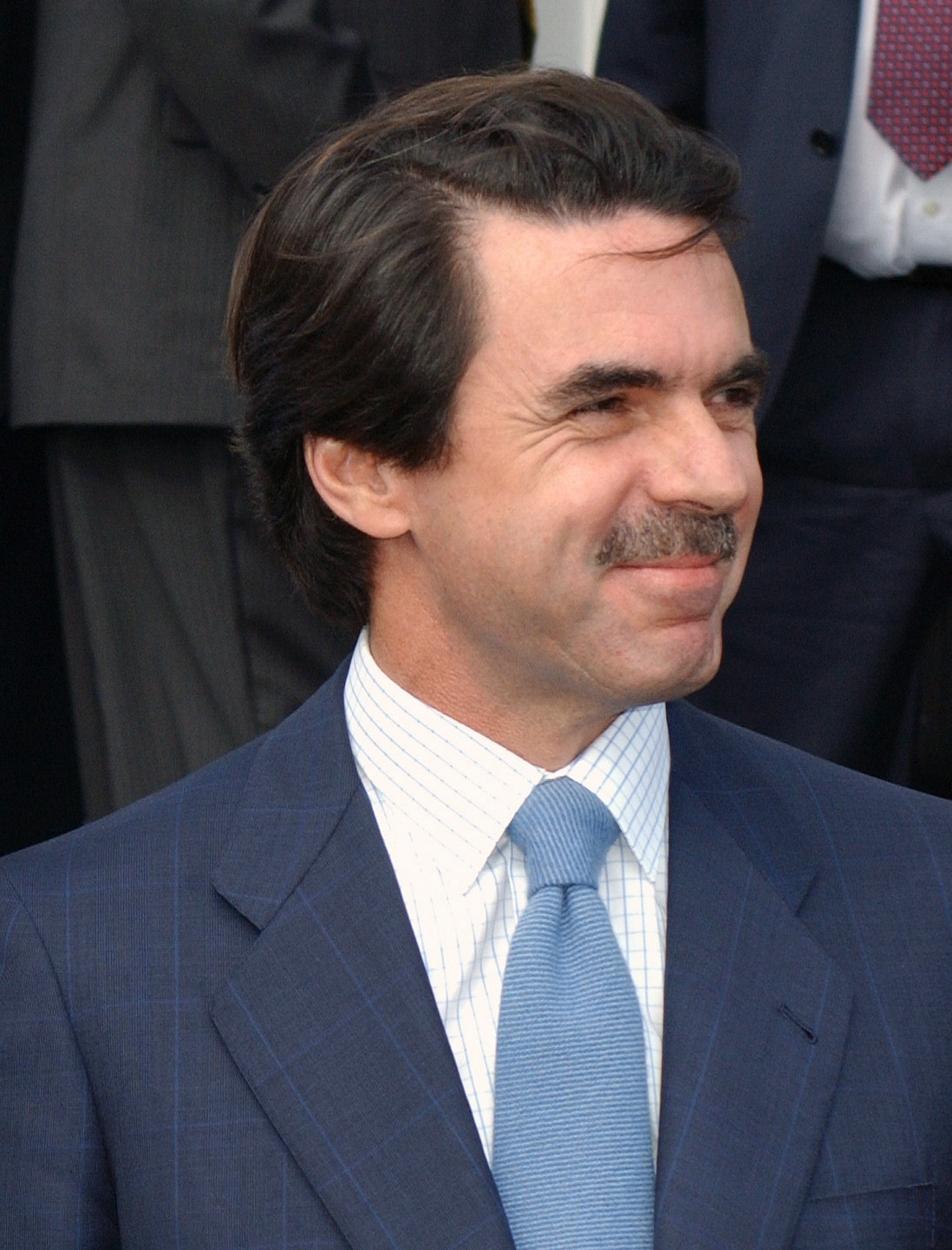
Former Prime Minister of Spain José María Aznar

The initiative was founded by:

- José María Aznar, former Prime Minister of Spain
- George Weigel, Senior Fellow Ethics and Public Policy Center
- Robert Agostinelli, founder of Rhone Group
- Alejandro Toledo, former President of Peru
- Václav Havel, former President of Czech Republic
- Marcello Pera, former President of the Italian Senate
- David Trimble, former First Minister of Northern Ireland and winner of the Nobel Peace Prize
- Andrew Roberts, historian
- John R. Bolton, U.S. Ambassador
- Carlos Bustelo, former Spanish Minister of Industry
- Fiamma Nirenstein, Vice President of the Committee on Foreign Affairs of the Italian Chamber of Deputies
- George Weidenfeld, publisher and member of the House of Lords

== Organisation and funding ==
FOII is headquartered in Madrid, but also has a UK registered charity.

Friends of Israel Initiative has been funded by a dozen private donors from Spain, America, Israel, France, Italy and Britain. It has a working budget of almost £1 million a year.

== See also ==
- Labour Friends of Israel
- Conservative Friends of Israel
- Liberal Democrat Friends of Israel
- Northern Ireland Friends of Israel
- European Friends of Israel
