= Northern Ireland Friends of Israel =

Political organisation

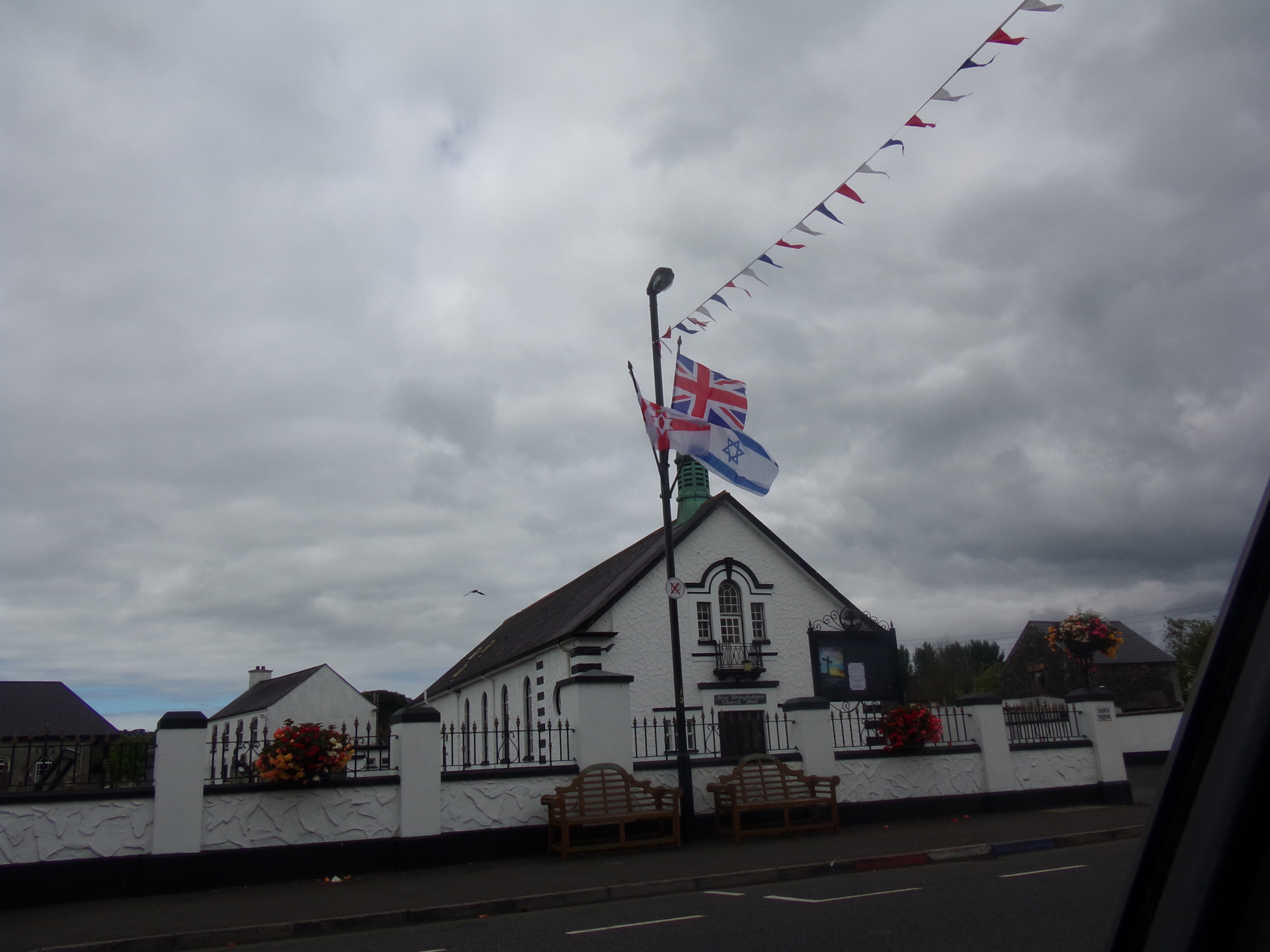
The Israeli flag alongside the Union Jack and the Ulster Banner in Broughshane. The Israeli flag is occasionally flown by unionists in Northern Ireland.

Northern Ireland Friends of Israel is a group dedicated to fostering better relations between Northern Ireland and the State of Israel.

The group was launched by the deputy ambassador of Israel, Talya Lador-Fresher, president of the Board of Deputies of British Jews, Henry Grunwald and former First Minister Ian Paisley on 12 March 2009 in Belfast at the Great Hall, Stormont.

Until his death on 3 November 2009, Lord Leonard Steinberg served as president. The current president is Gerald Steinberg and the co-chairmen are Steven Jaffe and Andrew Shaw.

The mission statement of Northern Ireland Friends of Israel was launched at a meeting at the Park Avenue Belfast on 6 May 2009 in the presence of the ambassador of Israel, Ron Prosor. The mission statement calls for positive engagement with those who seek "a lasting and just peace between Israel and its neighbours".

== See also ==
- Labour Friends of Israel
- Conservative Friends of Israel
- Liberal Democrat Friends of Israel
- European Friends of Israel
- Friends of Israel Initiative
