= Yachad (organization) =

Yachad, the national Jewish council for people with disabilities, is a national organization that addresses the needs of Jews who have disabilities, and makes possible their integration into Jewish life.

== Policy ==
Yachad has an inclusive policy that aims to give persons with disabilities the chance to have their place in the Jewish community. It helps to educate and advocate for understanding, acceptance, and outreach, and looks to foster a positive attitude towards people with differing abilities.

== Services ==
Yachad offers several clinical services for persons with disabilities. The organization gives customized guidance and support for families, siblings and parents.

The program "Our Way" includes persons who are hard of hearing and deaf-blind individuals. Shabbatons are inclusive weekend retreats, where Yachad members can be together with a group of mates. The "IVDU" schools offer students with special needs an understanding and nurturing educational background.

Yachad also supports adults with disabilities in building social relationships and navigating milestones such as dating and marriage within the Jewish community. According to Yachad International Director Avromie Adler, conversations around marriage for people with disabilities have become increasingly common in recent years.

== Yachad Israel ==
Yachad Israel is the Israeli branch of Yachad, the National Jewish Council for Disabilities, an agency of the Orthodox Union. It provides programs and support for Jewish individuals with disabilities and their families in Israel, including English-speaking families who have recently made aliyah. The branch operates chapters in Jerusalem, Beit Shemesh, and Gush Etzion.

Yachad Israel organizes weekly hubs, Shabbatonim, and an annual summer retreat called Nofesh. It also offers specialized programs such as women’s clubs, sports activities, Torah learning sessions, and activities for married couples with disabilities.

The branch is directed by Sima Kelner.

Yachad Israel has received independent media coverage, including a report by Israel National News on the opening of Yachad House in Israel. Coverage of the parent organization in North America has appeared in independent outlets such as Jewish Link and JNS Wire.
