= Liberal Democrat Friends of Israel =

Associated organisation of the Liberal Democrats

- Type: Associated Organisation of the Liberal Democrats
- President: Baron Palmer
- Vice Presidents: Alan Beith; Baroness Ludford
- Affiliations: Liberal Democrats
- Website: ldfi.org.uk

Liberal Democrat Friends of Israel (LDFI) is an associated organisation whose stated objective is to 'maximise support for the State of Israel within the British Liberal Democrat Party', and to 'promote policies which lead to peace and security for Israel within a Middle East peace settlement'.

== History ==
The Liberal Friends of Israel group was the first friends of Israel group in the Parliament of the United Kingdom.

The SDP Friends of Israel group was formed in July 1981 with Bill Rodgers as President.

The Liberal Friends of Israel and the SDP Friends of Israel groups were amalgamated into the Liberal Democrat Friends of Israel when the parties merged in 1988.

In July 2020, the LDFI issued a statement expressing "deep concern" about plans by the Israeli government to annex part of the West Bank.

In October 2020, the LDFI and the Board of Deputies of British Jews jointly wrote to Mendip District Council urging it to adopt the International Holocaust Remembrance Alliance definition of antisemitism, after the council voted unanimously against adopting it.

== Leadership ==
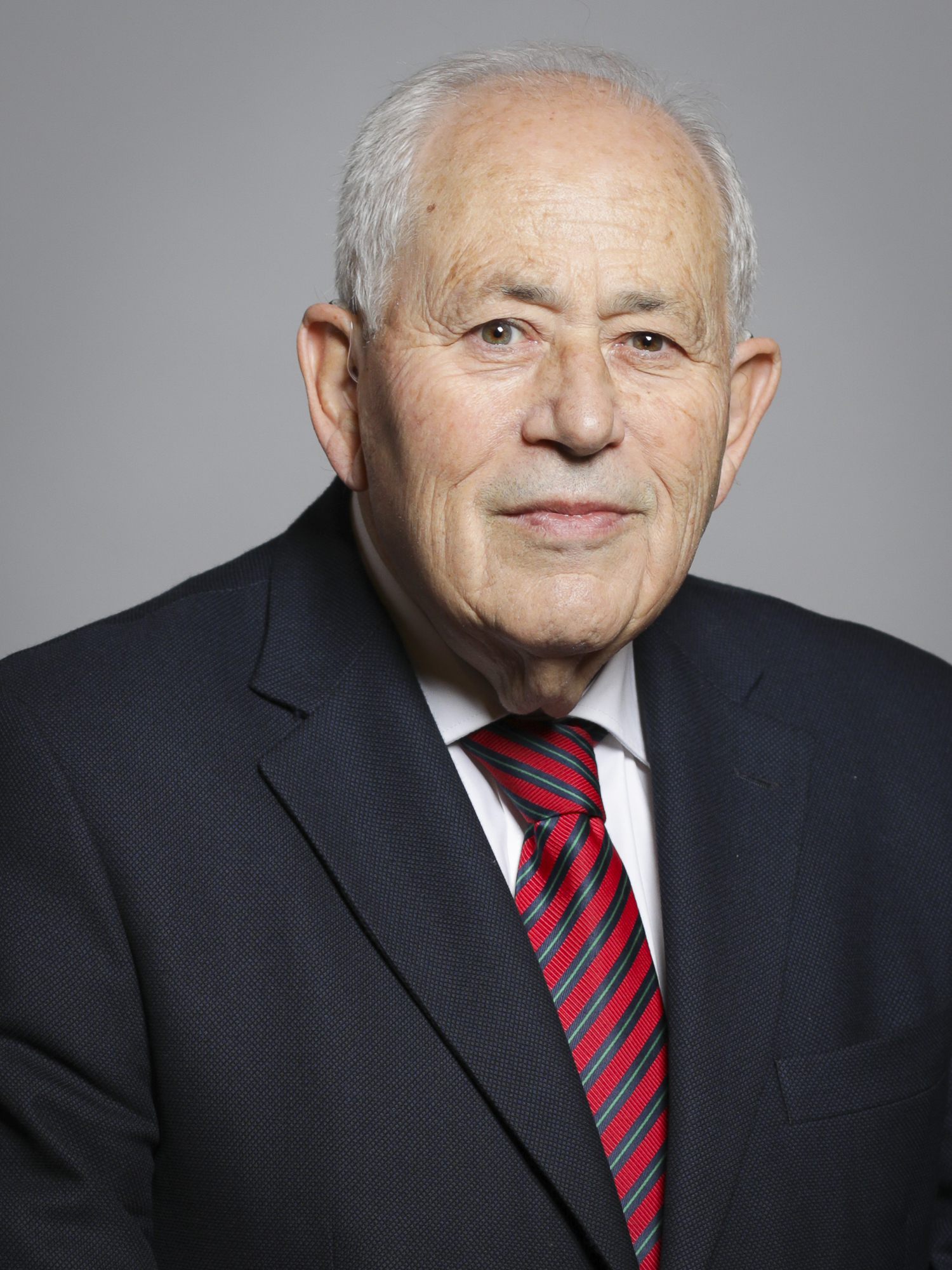
Lord Palmer, President of the LDFI

The President of Liberal Democrat Friends of Israel is Lord Palmer of Childs Hill. The Vice Presidents are Lord Beith, Lord Alliance, and Baroness Ludford. The Chair is Gavin Stollar and the Vice Chair is Jonathan Davies.

== Members of LDFI ==
In alphabetical order, members of Liberal Democrat Friends of Israel include:

- Lord Beith, Vice President of LDFI
- Ed Fordham, PPC for Hampstead and Kilburn in 2010 General Elections
- Matthew Harris, PPC for Hendon in the 2010 General Elections
- Baroness Ludford, MEP for London
- Lord Palmer of Childs Hill, President of LDFI
- Gavin Stollar, Chairman

== See also ==
- Liberal Democrat Friends of Turkey
- Labour Friends of Israel
- Conservative Friends of Israel
- Northern Ireland Friends of Israel
- European Friends of Israel
- Friends of Israel Initiative
