= London Jewish Forum =

Jewish organisation in London

Established in 2006, The London Jewish Forum (LJF) is dedicated to the promotion of Jewish life in London. The Forum provides a platform for engagement between London Jewry and the Greater London Authority, Mayor of London, London Boroughs and MPs. It is a joint project of the Jewish Leadership Council and the Board of Deputies of British Jews.

== Aims and organisation ==
LJF works to promote the full and active engagement of the Jewish community with civic life in London. It opposes antisemitism, racism and all forms of discrimination in London. The LJF works with all parts of the Jewish community regardless of religious; cultural or political affiliations or beliefs.

The London Jewish Forum has nine key platforms: Housing, Antisemitism and Community Cohesion, Health & Social Care, Culture & Heritage, Education & Young People, Transport, Social Action, Holocaust Commemoration, and Israel. Its co-Chairs are Amanda Bowman and Michael Ziff and it appointed Daniel Kosky as its Director in July 2020. It was established to engage with London Government after the rift between the Jewish Community and Mayor Ken Livingstone over comments he made to a Jewish reporter. Livingstone apologised at the launch of the London Jewish Forum in December 2006. The London Jewish Forum is apolitical and hosted separate mayoral breakfasts for community leaders with each of the main candidates in the 2008 London Mayoral Election including the eventual winner, Boris Johnson. Boris Johnson commended the London Jewish Forum for its work on housing in the capital.

In 2019, LJF's mandate was extended by the Board of Deputies and Jewish Leadership Council to cover political engagement in Hertfordshire to support the growing Jewish community in the area. It operates as the Hertfordshire Jewish Forum when operating in that county.

The London Jewish Forum hosted Mayoral Hustings for the Jewish community in both the 2016 London Mayoral Election and 2021 London Mayoral Election. It has also regularly produced a Jewish Manifesto for London, the 2021 version having been endorsed by Sadiq Khan, Shaun Bailey and Luisa Porritt.

In 2021, the London Jewish Forum was named as a founding signatory for the Anchor Institutions Charter alongside institutions such as the Metropolitan Police, NHS London, the Greater London Authority and the Church of England. The Charter was signed by major London based organisations with a commitment to help the city recover from COVID-19.

== Housing issues ==
The London Jewish Forum has been working with City Hall and the London Development Authority in City Hall to ensure future housing provision for London's strictly orthodox community. Mayor Boris Johnson publicly recognised the work London Jewish Forum in trying to resolve "the increasing desperate housing situation for the Charedi community in London".

== London 2012 ==
The London Jewish Forum is working with other major Jewish organisations to develop community engagement with the Olympic Games Jewish schools and their communities in meeting Jewish Olympians; the development of welfare, culture and religious services for Jewish athletes in the Olympic Village; a London 2012 Jewish website for visitors to the Games; the long-term legacy for the Jewish community within the five Olympic Boroughs and utilising sports to bring groups together and celebrate the cultural diversity of the city.
