= Jewish Leadership Council =

British organisation

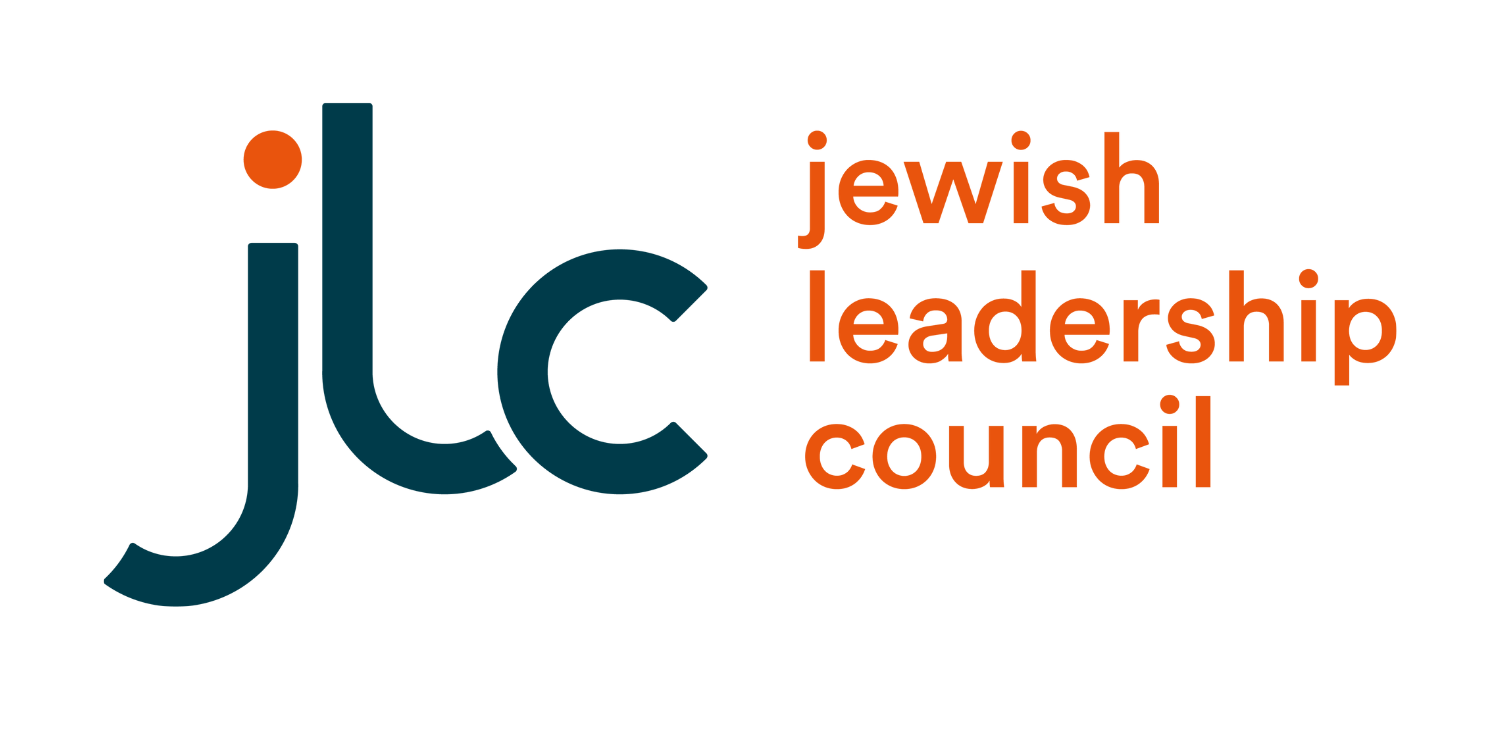
- Abbreviation: JLC
- Formation: 2003
- Registration no.: 1115343
- Purpose: Jewish charity which brings together the major British Jewish organisations to work for the good of the British Jewish community.
- Headquarters: Shield House, 6 Harmony Way, Hendon, London; NW4 2BZ
- Region served: United Kingdom
- Chairman: Keith Black
- Chief executive: Claudia Mendoza and Michelle Janes (jointly)
- Budget: £2,905,344 (2013)
- Website: The JLC

The Jewish Leadership Council (previously known as the Jewish Community Leadership Council) is an organisation in the United Kingdom, founded in 2003, whose declared aim is to forward the interests of the organised Jewish community in Britain. The council was founded by its first chairman, then president of the Board of Deputies of British Jews, Henry Grunwald, and a number of other senior UK Jewish leaders. The council acts as an umbrella group for various Jewish community organizations, charities, Zionist and pro-Israel advocacy groups.

The JLC represents the largest Jewish organisations in the UK, including synagogues, care organisations, education charities, regional Representative Councils and the Board of Deputies of British Jews.

From supporting the long-term aims of the community through data-led research to connecting members to each other, government and public institutions relevant to their work, the JLC works to build and maintain connections within the UK Jewish community. It works across the community regardless of religious, cultural, political affiliations or beliefs.

It has been widely noted that the council is not accountable to Jewish individuals and so does not model any respected form of democracy. It is therefore not clear or evidenced how closely it represents British Jews. Moreover, its choice of the term 'leadership' is challenged given that it has no demonstrable influence over the mundane or even religious lives of British Jews. See further criticism below.

== Leadership and management ==
=== Chair ===
In January 2022, Keith Black, CEO of the Regatta Group, became chair. Before this, the position was held by Jonathan Goldstein from May 2017 until January 2022. From 2009 to 2017 Mick Davis, chairman of the United Jewish Israel Appeal, was in the role. He was the first chairman of the council's executive committee.

=== CEO ===
Claudia Mendoza and Michelle Janes were appointed joint chief executives in 2020. They took over from Simon Johnson, a former Football Association executive, who held the CEO position from 2013 to 2020. Before this, Jeremy Newmark (former spokesperson for the Chief Rabbi Lord Sacks) held the CEO position from January 2006 until 2013. Under Newmark, the organisation increased its expenditure from £192,000 in 2007 to £2,782,000 in 2013.

== Membership ==
The JLC brings together the most senior lay leaders of the major institutions in each sector of UK Jewish life. Membership includes the chairs and presidents of synagogue movements, leaders of the main charities, welfare organisations and representative bodies as well as a group of vice-presidents comprising a number of Jewish VIPs and individual leaders such as Lord Levy, Sir Ronald Cohen, Lord Woolf, Lord Fink, Sir Trevor Chinn, Leo Noe and former board president and politician Lord Janner of Braunstone.

The Jewish Leadership Council's member organisations are the major institutions of UK Jewish life. Together, they touch on every aspect of Jewish life, from synagogues to social care organisations, political bodies to youth movements, community centres and charities. The JLC believes that bringing these different perspectives together helps joined-up and coherent thinking about the Jewish community.

The JLC's current constituent members are:

- Britain Israel Communications and Research Centre
- The Board of Deputies of British Jews
- Camp Simcha
- Chai Cancer Care
- Community Security Trust
- The Fed
- Jami
- Jewish Care
- Jewish Museum London
- Jewish Women's Aid
- JW3
- Kisharon
- Langdon
- Lead
- Leeds Jewish Representative Council
- London Jewish Forum
- Maccabi GB
- Jewish Representative Council for Greater Manchester and Region
- Masorti Judaism
- Mitzvah Day
- Nightingale Hammerson
- Norwood
- Partnerships for Jewish Schools
- Progressive Judaism (United Kingdom)
- S&P Sephardi Community
- University Jewish Chaplaincy
- UJIA
- Union of Jewish Students
- United Synagogue
- Women's International Zionist Organization UK
- Work Avenue
- World Jewish Relief
- Zionist Federation of Great Britain and Ireland
- Zionist Youth Council

== Connecting and co-ordinating the Jewish community ==
=== Cross-community collaboration ===
The JLC connects and co-ordinates member organisations, be this through the JLC CEO Forum and Council Meetings or cross-communal fora such as the HR Forum and a new Fundraising Forum.

The JLC sees itself as an integral part of the support network to members. JLC is a central point of expertise member charities and organisations can refer to, helping them to locate resources and find others who can help resolve issues. It also has the ability to co-ordinate members in line with their values and purpose A recent example of this type of work undertaken by the JLC is the establishment of the Jewish Community Refugee Task Force in March 2022 with the Board of Deputies of British Jews to ensure that the Jewish community could provide a co-ordinated, needs-led and effective response to the refugee crisis caused by the Russian invasion of Ukraine.

=== Nationwide advocacy ===
The JLC supports the London Jewish Forum and Jewish Representative Council of Greater Manchester and Region through a close working relationship and staffing of these organisations.

=== Jewish youth movements ===
The JLC created Reshet in response to joint research with UJIA on the informal (out of school) provisions available for young people in the UK Jewish community. Originally starting as a network that brings together the many Jewish youth movements, today Reshet also act as the primary provider of safeguarding expertise and training in the Jewish community. It has led the central community response to the Independent Inquiry into Child Sexual Abuse (IICSA) and provided training for communal bodies in safeguarding.

=== Supporting Jewish schools ===
PaJeS, now a JLC member, helps plan strategically for the continued provision of sufficient Jewish school places and works to maintain the schools' continued excellence.

== Other ==
=== Israel ===
In December 2006, the Jewish Leadership Council and the Board of Deputies of British Jews formed the Fair Play Campaign Group, a pro-Israel advocacy organization. The Fair Play Campaign co-ordinates activity against anti-Israel boycotts and other anti-Zionist campaigns.

In December 2009, the Council sought and published a legal opinion from Lord Pannick advocating a change in UK law to prevent the issuing of arrest warrants against Israeli leaders without prior consent of the Attorney General.

In June 2011, together with BICOM and the Board of Deputies, Council Chair Vivian Wineman, Chair of Trustees Mick Davis and CEO Jeremy Newmark, met Foreign Secretary William Hague to discuss developments in the Middle East.

=== Criticism ===
The Jewish Leadership Council has previously been criticised as self-appointed and unaccountable. Deputies have in the past noted that, while Board honorary officers are accountable to deputies, who themselves are accountable to their constituencies, the JLC had no such governance structure.

In February 2018, The Jewish Chronicle published an internal audit report into the conduct of Jeremy Newmark, while he was CEO of the council between 2006 and 2013, that alleged that he deceived the council out of "tens of thousands of pounds". The Jewish Chronicle claimed the council had covered up the former CEO's alleged behaviour, and accepted a resignation on the grounds of ill health. Newmark denied any wrongdoing, though he resigned as Chair of the Jewish Labour Movement two days later. The Charity Commission stated it had not been informed of these allegations of financial impropriety in 2013 which raised serious potential regulatory concerns which it was assessing. In March 2018, a three-member panel, with Charity Commission approval, began investigating the allegations. In February 2019, a police investigation was also opened. The panel later said that it could not quantify any missing funds due to the absence of key documents and records. The police closed their investigation in March 2019.
