= European Friends of Israel =

Political organization

European Friends of Israel (EFI) was a Brussels-based organization of European parliamentarians whose stated mission is "forging a stronger political relationship and a deeper understanding between Europe and Israel."

== History ==
Established in September 2006 by 300 MEPs and national MPs, European Friends of Israel aimed to bring together every national parliamentary friendship group with Israel from the EU 27 Member States, together with the friendship group with Israel within the European Parliament. EFI monitored all legislation that impacts Israel and supported many initiatives to help Israel exist within safe and secure borders. Its chairman was Gunnar Hökmark.

The organization was closed.

== Influence ==
EFI mustered 1,000 participants from all over Europe, the largest support group of its kind in the region, attracting more than 1,500 European parliamentarians and policymakers. In an official statement, EFI maintained that "Israel needs and deserves a better recognition of the close cultural and democratic bonds that it shares with the EU, to underpin greater EU support for the continuing challenges it faces over the coming years." High-level pronouncements reinforce how EFI recognizes Israel's bond with Europe but consistently highlight the lack of recognition. This is the element that sets the organization apart from other Israeli groups or pro-Israel grassroots NGOs in Europe. According to Siwiec, EFI mainly focused on elected political representatives with the goal of bringing together Israel-friendly EU Parliament.

EFI was considered a lobby group and likened to the American Israel Public Affairs Committee (AIPAC) in terms of its goals and initiatives. Studies showed the efficacy of the group thanks to its financial power and well-organized structure.

== Initiatives ==
EFI held multiple conferences in the European Parliament dealing important issues on the Israeli-European agenda:

On 29 November 2006, EFI held a press conference which dealt with "why the 3 Israeli Kidnapped Soldiers are not being released?" The Press Conference followed a private meeting between the representatives of the families of the three Israeli kidnapped soldiers and Members of the European Parliament who expressed their support for the families of the three Israeli kidnapped soldiers, Gilad Shalit, Udi Goldwasser and Eldad Regev.

On 7 March 2007, it held a conference calling for "Economic Sanctions against Iran". In 2007, EFI led 3 separate missions to EU member states. During a 2 days mission to Portugal in January, EFI's team met with the newly Portuguese Parliamentary Friendship Group with Israel. In Spain in February it met many high-level politicians from the leading political factions. In May, EFI met many Members of the Maltese parliament and other foreign officials.

On 5 June 2007, EFI led a delegation composed of 16 Members of the European Parliament and Members of National Parliaments from 11 different European nationalities to a three-day mission in Israel. The program included meetings with the Prime Minister of Israel, Ehud Olmert, the Deputy Prime Minister and Minister of Foreign Affairs, Tsipi Livni and other high-ranking Israeli officials.

On the occasion of the European Holocaust Remembrance Day (26-27 January 2008), EFI organized a 2-day mission to Auschwitz. The Delegation was composed of Members of the European Parliament, Members of the EU Member States' Parliaments as well as Members of the Knesset.

On the occasion of Israel's 60th anniversary, EFI collaborated with B'nai B'rith, Peres Center for Peace and the Israeli Mission to the EU to organize workshops, conferences and panels on Israel-related topics and Israel's relations with the European Union.

On the 6/7 November 2008, The EFI Policy Conference gathered together hundreds of Parliamentarians and high-officials from 42 European countries, including Members of the European Parliament, Members of the Council of Europe as well as Members of the Knesset. The gathering aimed to promote a better understanding between Europe and Israel and called for an upgrade in relations between the two.

== See also ==
- Friends of Israel Initiative
- Conservative Friends of Israel
- Labour Friends of Israel
- Liberal Democrat Friends of Israel
- Northern Ireland Friends of Israel
