= Henry Grunwald (barrister) =

British lawyer

Henry Grunwald CBE KC is a British barrister.

He was President of the Board of Deputies of British Jews and a founder and first Chairman of the Jewish Leadership Council from 2003 until 2009. After the conclusion of his second term as President he was appointed the President of World Jewish Relief. He was appointed Officer of the Order of the British Empire (OBE) in the 2009 Birthday Honours for services to the Jewish community and to inter-faith relations, and was appointed Commander of the Order of the British Empire (CBE) in the 2026 Birthday Honours for services to Holocaust Remembrance and Education.

Grunwald's profession is that of a criminal barrister, specialising in serious crime. Due to his success as a barrister he was appointed a King’s Counsel in 1999. He was a Trustee and Vice-Chair of the Holocaust Memorial Day Trust from 2005 until 2013, and now chairs the National Holocaust Centre and Museum.
