= Zionist Federation of Great Britain and Ireland =

British Zionist organisation

- Abbreviation: ZF
- Formation: 1899; 127 years ago
- Headquarters: London, England
- Location: United Kingdom
- Chair: Rabbi Lea Mühlstein
- Website: www.zionist-federation.uk

The Zionist Federation of Great Britain and Ireland, also known as the British Zionist Federation or simply the Zionist Federation (ZF), is an umbrella organisation for the Zionist movement in the United Kingdom, representing more than 30 organisations and over 50,000 affiliated members. It was established in 1899 to campaign for a permanent homeland for the Jewish people.

== History ==
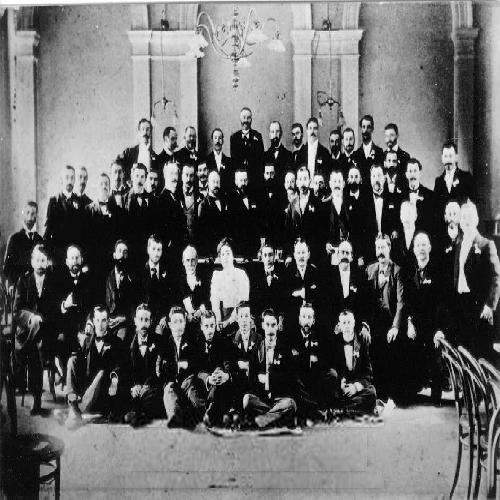
The first conference of the Zionist Federation of England 1899

The organisation was established in 1899 to campaign for a permanent homeland for the Jewish people.

In 1917, the British Foreign Secretary Sir Arthur Balfour communicated the Balfour Declaration to the leader of United Kingdom's Jewish community Lord Rothschild for transmission to the Zionist Federation.

In 1920, the Zionist Federation founded Women's International Zionist Organization (WIZO) and Keren Hayesod. The ZF also founded a number of Zionist youth movements.

== Aims and objectives ==
It describes itself as "the UK's leading Israel advocacy and grassroots organisation" which "celebrates Israel and challenges our enemies."

Among its aims and objectives are to:

- Support, co-ordinate and facilitate the work of all its affiliates nationwide, and to continue its commitment to the Zionist youth movements.
- Encourage the participation of Jews in Zionist activities, including education, culture, Hebrew language and Israel information, underpinned by the belief that the main goal of Zionism is Aliyah.

== Activities ==
Activities include: training, campaigning, media engagement, lobbying, combatting the BDS movement, working with students and cultural events.

== Structure and personnel ==
The Zionist Federation is an umbrella organisation encompassing most of the Zionist organizations and individuals in the country and, as such, represents the Zionist movement in the United Kingdom.

As of early 2023, the chair is Rabbi Lea Mühlstein.

== See also ==
- David Lindo Alexander
- Federation of Zionist Youth
- Habonim Dror
- Jewish Labour Movement
- Israel lobby in the United Kingdom
