= UJIA =

Registered charity in the United Kingdom

- Abbreviation: UJIA
- Formation: 1920
- Legal status: Registered charity
- Headquarters: London
- Location: 1 Torriano Mews, London, England NW5 2RZ
- Region served: United Kingdom and Israel
- Chief Executive: Mandie Winston
- Website: ujia.org

UJIA (United Jewish Israel Appeal) is a registered charity, based in London, that works with young people in the United Kingdom and in the Galilee region of Israel. It provides formal and informal educational programmes that aim to enhance young British Jews' sense of Jewish identity and their connection with Israel. Its chief executive is Mandie Winston and its chair is Louise Jacobs, the first woman in the role.

UJIA's remit includes overseeing and sponsoring Israel group tours that are organised by Jewish religious and ideological organisations for young people in the Jewish community.

In 2017, UJIA launched a £300,000 fund to invest in Israeli start-up businesses that are concerned with improving education, employment and community development.

The British Prime Minister, Theresa May, was the guest speaker at a dinner, hosted by UJIA on 17 September 2018, that was held to mark the 70th anniversary of the foundation of Israel.

== Notable persons ==
- Jonathan Kestenbaum, Baron Kestenbaum (born 1959), chief operating officer of investment trust RIT Capital Partners, and a Labour member of the House of Lords
