= Gill and Coote v El Vino Co Ltd =

1982 Court of Appeal case

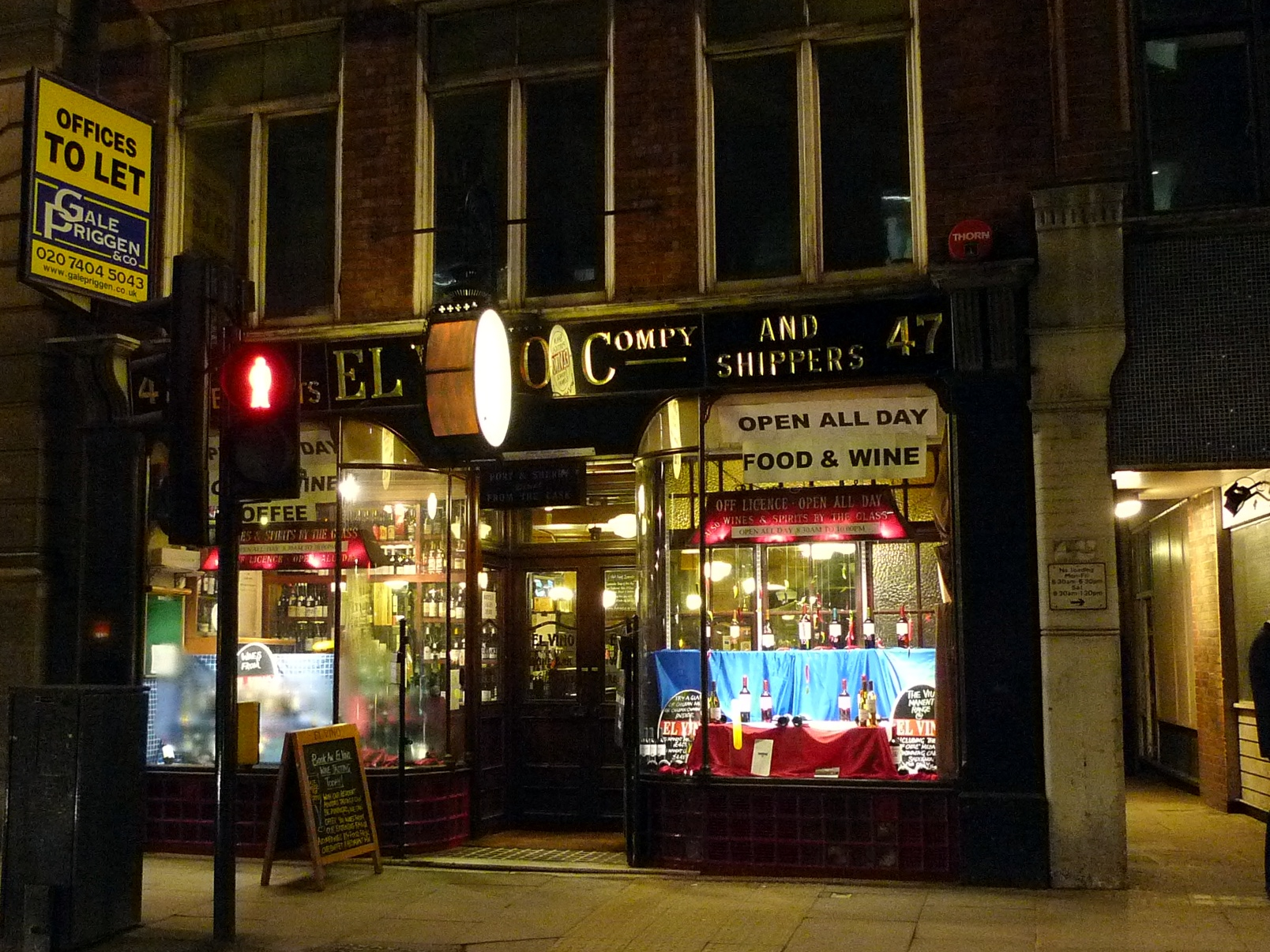
- El Vino, pictured in 2009
- Court: Court of Appeal
- Decided: 8 November 1982

Case history
- Appealed from: Mayor's and City of London Court (decided 3 July 1981)

Court membership
- Judges sitting: Edward Eveleigh, Hugh Griffiths and Sir Roger Ormrod

Keywords
- Sex discrimination

Gill and Coote v El Vino Co Ltd was a case heard in the Court of Appeal in 1982. It concerned a policy in the El Vino wine bar in Fleet Street, London, of not serving women at the bar and instead requiring them to order by table service in a back room. A number of women had previously unsuccessfully brought legal actions against the bar under the Sex Discrimination Act 1975.

Solicitor Tess Gill and journalist Anna Coote instigated legal action against El Vino at the Mayor's and City of London Court in 1981. The case was supported by the National Council for Civil Liberties and the Equal Opportunities Commission. An attempt to secure an injunction to stop the policy before the court case failed. The case was found against the women on 3 July by Judge Ranking who decided that the women had not suffered any unfavourable treatment.

The case was appealed and was heard in November 1982. El Vino was represented by Eldred Tabachnik QC who argued that the policy was beneficial to women, protecting them from "pushing and jostling" at the bar, and preventing embarrassing situations where staff may need to reach between their legs to reach wine bottles. The judges, Lord Justices Edward Eveleigh, Hugh Griffiths and Sir Roger Ormrod, found in favour of Gill and Coote. They noted that the policy denied women a choice of where to be served and prevented them from mixing with men in the bar where they might pick up gossip from other journalists and lawyers. The case has been described as "one of the most celebrated and publicised sex discrimination proceedings" and demonstrated the effectiveness of the Sex Discrimination Act.

== Background ==
El Vino is a wine bar in Fleet Street. It was popular with journalists and lawyers, because many national newspapers had their headquarters on that street and it is adjacent to The Temple, a legal district. Since the Second World War, the bar had had a policy of serving women only by table service in a back room and not at the main bar, in which they were not permitted to stand. It was speculated that this policy may have been brought in to prevent prostitutes from soliciting clients on the premises, or because male journalists returning from war service in 1945 did not like that the bar had been utilised by female journalists in their absence.

Women who sought to break the rule were shouted at by the bar's manager or else banned from the premises. El Vino's owner Frank Bower, was known to have conservative views about women in the bar and also imposed a strict dress code of jacket, shirt and tie for male customers. The bar defended the policy as upholding the "old-fashioned ideas of chivalry". Women comprised around 15 per cent of the bar's customers.

In summer 1970 a group of female journalists had walked into the bar and demanded to be served but they were ejected and the protest mocked by some men in the newspaper industry as "a storm in a sherry glass". Morning Star photographer Sheila Gray tried to get served at the bar on the day the Sex Discrimination Act 1975 came into force on 29 December 1975. She was refused and brought a case against El Vino at the Westminster County Court, supported by the Equal Opportunities Commission, a statutory body set up by the act and required, under section 75 of it, to provide legal advice to complainants.

The case was decided against Gray in 1978. The court's Judge Ruttle cited a judgment by Lord Denning in an appeal case in which Denning stated that it was wrong for the act to obliterate all differences between men and women or to remove chivalry shown by men to women. By 1980 El Vino had won three legal challenges brought against it under the Sex Discrimination Act.

== Attempted injunction ==
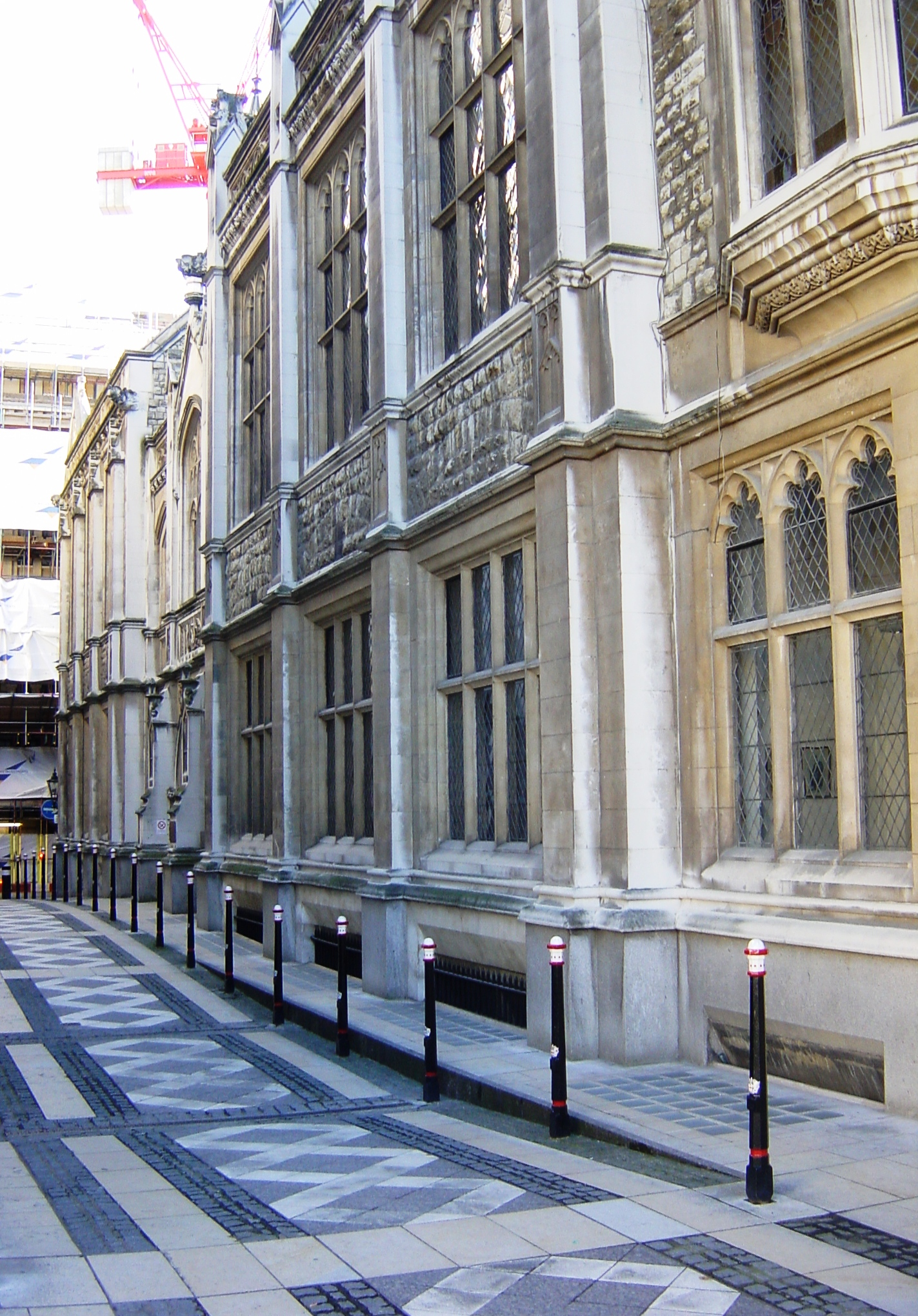
Exterior of the Mayor's and City of London Court

The National Council for Civil Liberties supported bringing a fourth case against El Vino. Solicitor Tess Gill and journalist Anna Coote were selected as plaintiffs as representative of the two main professions that used the bar. The pair were also co-authors of the book Women's Rights: A Practical Guide. The pair entered El Vino's bar and asked for drinks; they were accompanied by two male colleagues as witnesses. Gill and Coote had asked the men to wear kilts but they had refused. The men successfully ordered drinks but when the women attempted to do the same, the bar tender refused to serve them and told them to sit in the back room. Gill and Coote indicated that they would prefer to remain in the bar and left when they were told this was not permitted. The male colleagues stayed in the bar and finished their drinks; Gill later said "we thought they should have walked out with us".

The women applied for an injunction against El Vino at the Mayor's and City of London Court, which was at the time the County Court for the City of London where the bar was located. The women sought an injunction to order El Vino to serve women at the bar. A hearing was held on 3 March 1981 with Judge Ranking, Gill and Coote were represented by John Melville-Williams QC. The bar's managing director, Christopher Mitchell, argued that doing so would cause serious financial loss to the business. Following a one-hour hearing Ranking refused the injunction, noting that a civil case could be brought in a few months, and that wait would not cause any new harm to women, given that the ban had been in place for decades.

== County Court case ==
A formal civil case was brought against El Vino under article 29 of the Sex Discrimination Act concerning "less favourable treatment in the provision of services to women". Gill and Coote were represented pro bono by the solicitors Seifert, Sedley and Company whose Michael Seifert also acted as a witness in the case. The case was heard by Ranking at the Mayor's and City of London Court and was decided on 3 July 1981.

In a reserved judgment Ranking found in favour of El Vino and awarded them legal costs. Gill and Coote estimated their legal costs as somewhere in excess of £1,000 while El Vino's were a little lower. Ranking stated that he did not believe that parliament intended for every occurrence of sexual discrimination to be brought before the courts and considered that a reasonable person would not find the El Vino rule resulted in less favourable treatment for women. He also stated that he thought Gill and Coote had overstated their dismay at the El Vino policy, which he thought had only impacted a small number of people.

Gill and Coote stated their intention of appealing the case to higher courts, potentially as far as the House of Lords which was then the nation's highest appellate court. Mitchell described the use of public funds, via the Equal Opportunities Commission, to provide advice on the case as "monstrous".

== Court of Appeal case ==
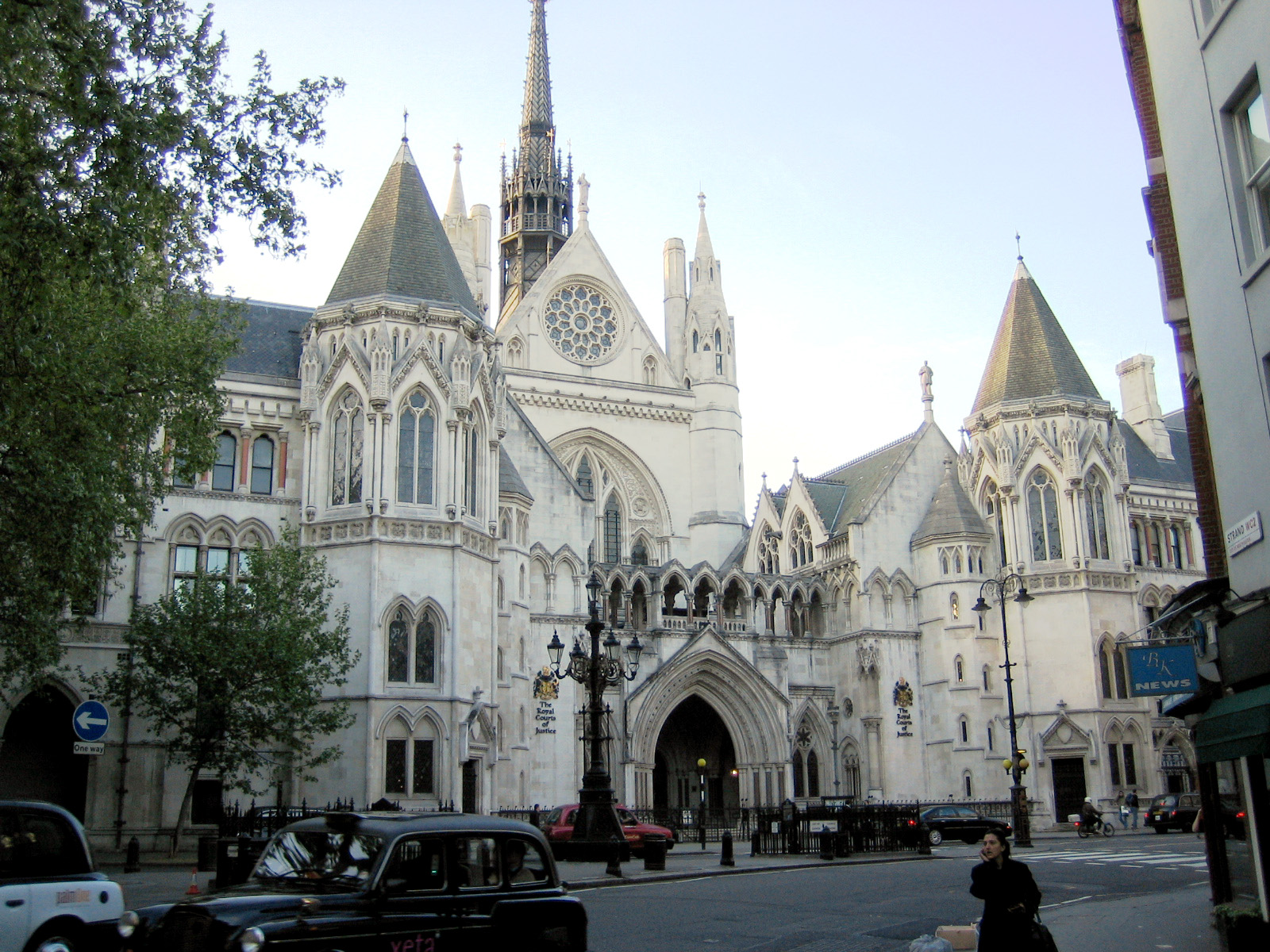
The Royal Courts of Justice, home to the Court of Appeal

Anthony Lester QC served as advisor to the Equal Opportunities Commission during this period. He considered the Gill and Coote case unlikely to succeed and that it raised no important matter of principles, so advised the Commission not to proceed with an appeal. The Commission decided to act against this advice and provided funding for the case.

The case came before the Court of Appeal in early November and was concluded on 8 November 1982. It was heard at the Royal Courts of Justice, about 300 m (0.2 miles) from El Vino. The judges, Lord Justice Edward Eveleigh, Lord Justice Hugh Griffiths and Lord Justice Sir Roger Ormrod, all had to declare an interest because they had all been customers of El Vino. Neither the plaintiffs nor defendant objected to the judges proceeding with the case. El Vino was represented by Eldred Tabachnik QC. The judges refused to dismiss the case under the legal maxim of de minimis non curat lex, stating that it was more than a mere trifle that women were banned from the bar as it provided a unique atmosphere, in great demand by the male patrons.

Tabachnik argued that the policy benefitted women and that the alternative, of women standing in the bar, was less favourable. Tabachnik stated that women in the bar would be subject to "pushing and jostling", which he described as like being on a rush hour train. Ormrod then asked Tabachnik: "are you saying it is a sexual characteristic to enjoy being crushed at the bar?". Tabachnik also stated that women at the bar would be embarrassing for staff who might have to "procure wine from floor level through the legs of a lady who happens to be standing by the wine racks". Tabachnik's summing-up lasted for three-and-a-quarter hours.

The judges deliberated for only five minutes before finding in favour of Gill and Coote. Griffiths said that the bar's position as one of the "gossip shops of Fleet Street" meant that women, confined to tables in a back room, were disadvantaged, being unable to pick up the gossip of the day. He thought that women were "refused facilities that are accorded to men, and the only question that remains is: is she being treated less favourably than men? I think that permits of only one answer: of course she is". Eveleigh stated that "in this case a woman was denied certain things which a man could have. She was denied the opportunity to drink where others drank, and to mix with others who were drinking in that area. She was denied a flexibility of choice. There might be only one or two seats vacant at a table and she might have to wait a considerable time before being joined by companions with whom she wished to converse. She might prefer to stand and talk but she could not do so if she was obliged to sit at a table where there was no room for all in the group". It was noted that the court determined that women were being discriminated against because they were not offered a choice of how they were served, which was available to men.

El Vino was ordered to pay legal costs, estimated at £8,000–9,000, and refused leave to appeal to the House of Lords.

== Aftermath ==
On the night of the decision there was a rush of women to the bar at El Vino to celebrate victory. One observer noted "there are more women at the bar than men - it's chaos". The bar staff served the first woman there, Press Association journalist Heather Mills, but then refused to serve any other women; they were ignored in favour of men at the bar. Around an hour after opening the bar staff began to serve other women. Coote and Gill arrived at the bar but were refused service and were barred from the premises by the manager. They protested against this on the pavement outside. El Vino stated that they would serve any woman who "genuinely wanted to drink at the bar" but not those who were just making a "feminist point". The ban against Coote and Gill entering the premises was lifted by 16 November, though bar staff refused to serve them drinks, claiming it was a landlord's right to do so, without reason, under common law. Seifert wrote to El Vino warning of potential further legal action if they were not served.

Gill and Coote v El Vino Co Ltd demonstrated that cases brought under the Sex Discrimination Act could act effectively to end discrimination. It also demonstrated that a defence on the grounds of perceived courtesy or propriety to other sexes was not effective. In April 1983 the Daily Telegraph described the case as "one of the most celebrated and publicised sex discrimination proceedings". It was used by the Equal Opportunities Commission in a 1983 publication aimed at encouraging similar cases; the publication noted that the case had established a legal precedent against discrimination by licensed premises. In 2017 Coote and Gill attended a celebration at El Vino, now under new owners, for the 35th anniversary of the case; the event raised money for the Fawcett Society, which campaigns for gender equality.
