= Anna Coote =

English writer and activist (born 1947)

- Born: Anna Mary Coote; 1 April 1947 (age 79)
- Education: University of Edinburgh
- Occupations: Writer, editor, policy analyst, policy advocate
- Parent(s): John Coote, Silvia Syson
- Website: neweconomics.org/profile/anna-coote

Anna Coote (born 1947) is an English writer, editor, policy analyst and policy advocate who is Principal Fellow at the New Economics Foundation. She has been a lifelong political activist in support of civil rights, women's rights, social justice and sustainable development.

== Early life: student editor and activist ==
Anna Mary Coote was born on 1 April 1947 to John Coote and Silvia Syson. Her father, then a captain in the Royal Navy, was frequently reposted, both around the UK and for two years in Washington, D.C., so Anna and her sisters were educated at several different schools.

From 1965, she read Modern History and Politics at the University of Edinburgh, where she edited the student newspaper, The Student. Coote played an important role in bringing about student reforms and the resignation of Malcolm Muggeridge, the Rector of the university, in 1968. The Students' Representative Council (SRC) had passed a motion calling on the Student Health Service to provide the contraceptive pill to female students on request and to provide free information on contraception. The next issue of The Student called on Muggeridge to support the SRC's demand. Muggeridge attacked the motion for promoting promiscuity and announced his resignation from the pulpit of St Giles' Cathedral in January 1968.

== Working and political life ==
=== 1968–79: journalist and author ===
Coote left Edinburgh early with an Ordinary degree to work as a journalist at The Observer newspaper from 1968 to 1971. In 1971, she became staff writer on Ink, an alternative weekly newspaper founded by Richard Neville. At Ink, she covered the six-week-long Oz trial, in which Neville and his co-editors of the British underground magazine Oz were prosecuted on three charges, including obscenity. She then became a freelance journalist, contributing to the Evening Standard, The Guardian, The Sunday Times and other newspapers and magazines.

This period saw her involvement in civil rights, the National Council for Civil Liberties (NCCL) and the emerging women's movement. She co-founded Women's Report, a weekly feminist newspaper, and co-authored two Penguin guides, to Civil Liberty in 1972 (ISBN 9780140522914) and Women's Rights in 1974 (ISBN 9780140523058).

=== 1978–89: editor and campaigner ===
Coote was appointed Deputy Editor of the New Statesman from 1978 to 1982.

In 1982, the book Sweet freedom: the struggle for women's liberation, by Coote and Beatrix Campbell, was published.

Also in 1982, Coote and Tess Gill won a case against El Vino’s in the Court of Appeal; this ended El Vino’s ban on women standing at the bar. They had lost the case at Mayor's and City of London Court before this.

Coote then turned to current affairs television as editor and producer of Diverse Productions from 1982 to 1986. Diverse was set up to pioneer programming on politics and current affairs to the new Channel 4 based on tough journalistic standards. Coote was producer and presenter on current affairs programmes The Friday Alternative and Diverse Reports. In 1987, she worked as columnist on the short-lived left-wing tabloid newspaper, News on Sunday.

=== 1989–2008: director, commissioner, researcher ===
Since 1989, Coote has been prominent as a researcher, policy analyst and campaigner on a wide range of issues, including social policy, sustainable development, public health policy, public involvement and democratic dialogue, gender and equality. From 1989 to 1998, she was Senior Research Fellow and Deputy Director of the Institute for Public Policy Research (IPPR). From 1998 to 2004, she was Director of Health Policy at the King's Fund; and from 2005 to 2008, she led the Healthcare Commission's work on engaging patients and the public.

Her publications during this period covered a wide spread of topics, including the potential of citizens' juries, the politics of gender, social rights, and inequalities in health.

In 2000, Coote was appointed a member of the UK Sustainable Development Commission, which role she held until shortly before 2010, when the SDC was abolished by the incoming Coalition government in the "bonfire of quangos". With her brief as Commissioner for Health, she linked health issues with broader sustainable development concerns.

=== 2008–2025: eco-social policy researcher and campaigner ===
In 2008, Coote joined the New Economics Foundation (NEF) as Head of Social Policy and later Principal Fellow. Her writings at this time included campaigns for upstream prevention in health ("health not hospitals"), a shorter working week, combining work and caring roles.

In 2012, Coote put forward the target of a 21-hour or three-day work week. The New Economics Foundation stated that this would provide a better work-life balance, would better balance work hours across the population and would help towards a more sustainable and less carbon-dependent economy.

In 2020, Coote with Andrew Percy authored The Case for Universal Basic Services. It initiated the campaign for universal basic services, as an alternative to Universal Basic Income, a debate that continues across Europe. In 2021, she started a related campaign: The Social Guarantee, which advocates for universal basic services in addition to a living wage and a living income.

In 2023, she was invited to present this work at the Beyond Growth conference at the European Parliament in Brussels. This gathering of 2,000 people over three full days attracted diverse reactions: "Meet the lefty Europeans who want to shrink the economy" (The Economist) and "a milestone moment on the road to transformation" (Partners for a New Economy).

== Honours and citations ==
- Honorary DLitt, University of Bath, 1999
- Commissioner for Health, UK Sustainable Development Commission, 2000–2009

== Selected publications ==
- 1972. Civil Liberty: The NCCL Guide (with Lawrence Grant)
- 1974. Women's Rights: A Practical Guide (with Tess Gill)
- 1982. Sweet freedom: the struggle for women's liberation (with Beatrix Campbell)
- 1990. Power and Prejudice: Women and Politics (with Polly Pattullo)
- 1992. The Welfare of Citizens: Developing new social rights (editor)
- 1997. Citizens' Juries: Theory into Practice (with Jo Lenaghan)
- 2000. New Gender Agenda (editor)
- 2013. The Prevention Papers (editor, with Mike Harris)
- 2013. Time On Our Side: Why We All Need a Shorter Working Week (editor, with Jane Franklin)
- 2020. The Case for Universal Basic Services (with Andrew Percy)
- 2020. The Case for a Four Day Week (with Aidan Harper and Alfie Stirling)
- 2023. The Case for a Social Guarantee: Universal access to life’s essentials
