= Dutch Cross of Resistance =

Dutch award

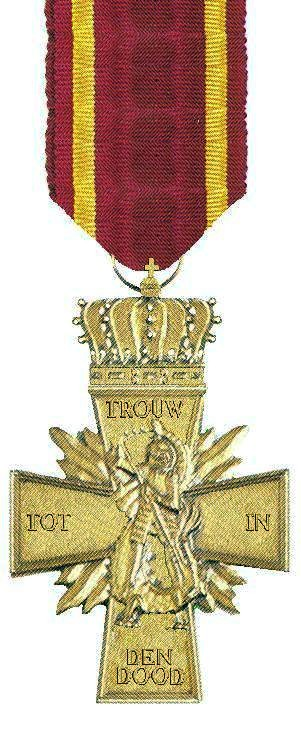
- The Dutch Cross of Resistance
- Type: Civil decoration
- Awarded for: Extreme bravery awarded to the Dutch Resistance
- Presented by: Kingdom of the Netherlands
- Status: No longer awarded
- Established: 3 May 1946

Highlights
- Total: 95 times
- Total awarded posthumously: 93 times
- Ribbon bar of the Dutch Cross of Resistance

Precedence
- Next (higher): Honorary Sabre
- Next (lower): Honorary Medal for Charitable Assistance

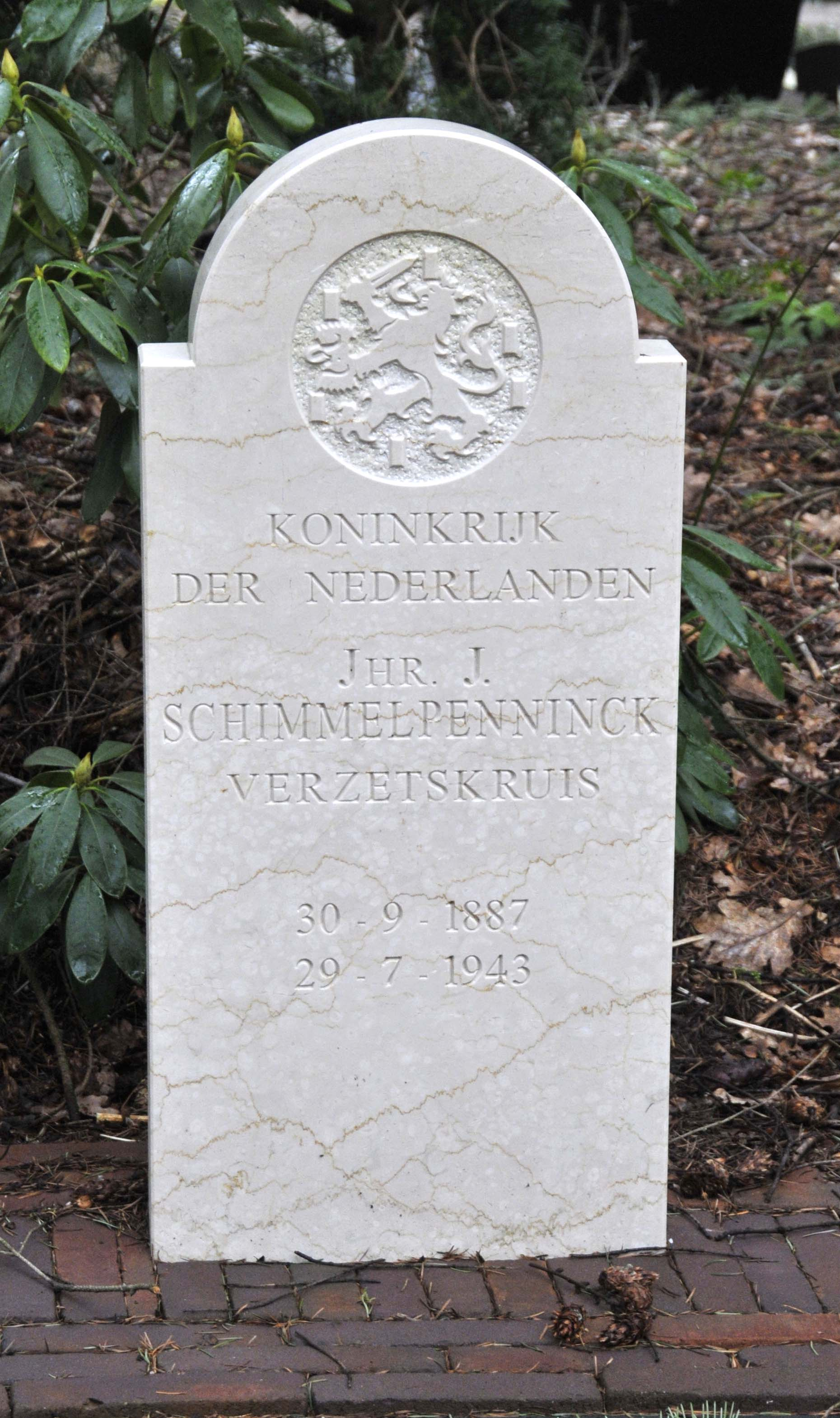
Grave of Jhr. Johan Schimmelpenninck in Amersfoort. A wine merchant, he was active in the Dutch Resistance during the Second World War and was imprisoned and tortured, before being executed in 1943 near Leusden. The tombstone notes his Verzetskruis, awarded posthumously in 1952.

The Verzetskruis 1940–1945 ('Resistance Cross 1940–1945') is a decoration for valour in the Netherlands. Instituted on May 3, 1946, it was awarded in recognition of the individual courage shown in resistance against the enemies of the Netherlands and for the maintenance of liberties. It is one of the highest decorations in the Netherlands.

Before the Netherlands was liberated in May 1945, the Dutch government in London had developed a valid and balanced system of decorations, both civil and military. In addition to the existing Military Order of William, they were created new ones as the Bronze Lion, the Bronze Cross, the Cross of Merit and the Cross of the Flyer. But there was no valid award to reward members of resistance organizations, while neighboring countries had already filled this gap. As it was not agreed that the acts of the Resistance could be rewarded with an existing military decoration, it was decided to create a specific one.

During the war, each of the acts of Resistance was considered as good as any other. In addition, other countries had distinguished the Dutch resistance with decorations such as the British King's Medal for Courage in the Cause of Freedom or the American Medal of Freedom. On the other hand, there was Queen Wilhelmine's personal wish that the work of the Resistance was to be rewarded.

The cross was awarded in 2 formats: 60 mm × 36 mm (2.4 in × 1.4 in) for survivors and 80 mm × 48 mm (3.1 in × 1.9 in) for those who received it posthumously.

It has been granted 95 times, 93 of them to deceased resistance workers (85 Dutch, 7 French, 2 Belgians and 1 to the Monument to the Jews killed during the Holocaust).

== Badge ==
A bronze cross on a flame star, and a royal crown on top. In the center is the image of Saint George (symbolizing the Dutch Resistance) killing the dragon (the Nazis). On the arms of the cross is the inscription TROUW TOT IN DEN DOOD (Loyal unto death). On the reverse side, a flaming sword breaks a chain in two.

It hangs from a crimson galloon, with an orange line at each edge.

== Notable recipients ==
- Paul Guermonprez
- Walraven van Hall
- Bernardus IJzerdraat
- Gerrit Kastein
- Helena Kuipers-Rietberg
- Denis Mesritz
- Johannes Post
- Hannie Schaft
- Richard Schoemaker
- Benjamin Marius Telders
- Gerrit van der Veen
- Nicolaas Van 't Wout
- Peggy van Lier
- Mathilde Verspyck
- Pierre Versteegh
- Gabrielle Weidner

== See also ==
- Military William Order
- Order of the Netherlands Lion
- Order of Orange Nassau
- Resistance Memorial Cross, a lower level award
