= El Vino =

Wine bar in Fleet Street

Coordinates: 51.5140°N 0.1092°W

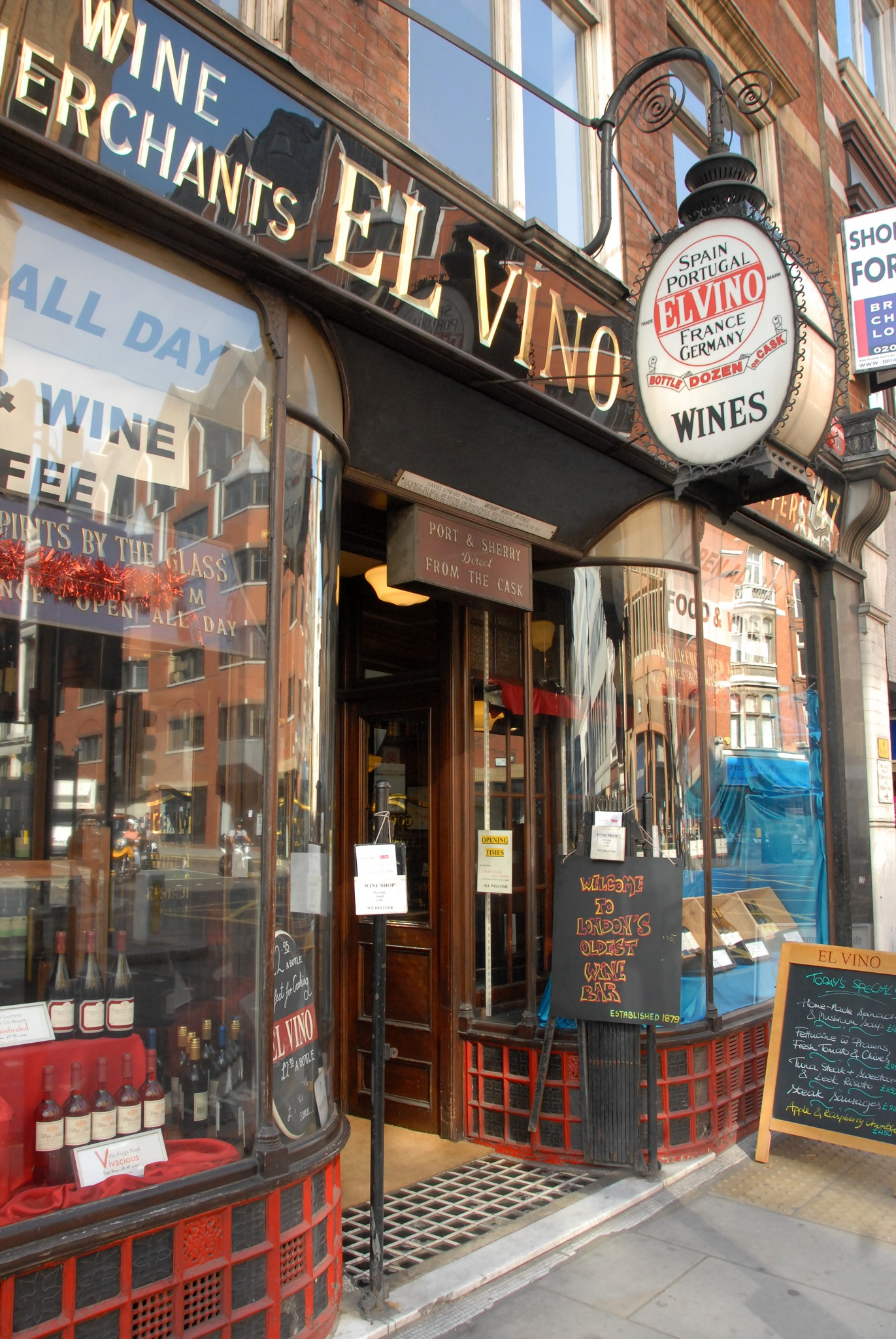
El Vino in 2007

El Vino, also known as El Vino's, is a wine bar and off-licence in London's Fleet Street that was famously patronised by journalists when many national newspapers were based nearby. It is still patronised by lawyers as the surrounding area is still London's legal district.

The business was founded by the wine merchant Alfred Bower in Mark Lane as Bower and Co. in 1879. That was on the east side of the City of London and, as the business prospered by selling imported Burgundy, claret, and sherry, he opened four more wine bars, including the famous branch in Fleet Street. In 1923, the business had to change its name, so that Bower could become an alderman, and so it was renamed El Vino – the Spanish name for wine. Bower then became Lord Mayor and the business continued in his family until 2015, when it was sold to the Davy chain of wine bars.

== Law ==
While journalists are not so common in Fleet Street now, the bar is still popular with the barristers and solicitors who work in the surrounding courts and legal offices. The bar inspired the fictional Pomeroy's in Rumpole of the Bailey and El Vino now has a Rumpole Room to commemorate this.

For much of its history, the bar required male customers to wear ties, and although women customers were permitted, they were not allowed to stand at the bar. In 1982, Anna Coote and Tess Gill won a case against El Vino’s in the Court of Appeal; this ended El Vino’s ban on women standing at the bar. They had lost the case at Mayor's and City of London Court before this.

== Regulars ==
Regular characters and patrons included:

- Alan Watkins, political commentator
- Geoffrey Van-Hay, the imposing manager for many years, who kept order with charm and wit
- Ian Fleming who worked in a nearby stockbrokers and subsequently wrote in Mitre Court
- Nigel Dempster, gossip columnist for the Daily Mail
- Peregrine Worsthorne, columnist for the Daily Telegraph
- Paul Johnson, political commentator
- G. K. Chesterton and Hilaire Belloc both were regular patrons during the early years of their collaboration

== See also ==
- Alfred Wintle
- Lunchtime O'Booze – the fictional stereotype of a bibulous journalist used as a regular byline in Private Eye
