= Denis Mesritz =

Dutch Member of the Resistance

- Born: Denis Claire Baudouin Mesritz; November 16, 1919; The Hague, Netherlands
- Died: March 16, 1945 (aged 25); Rathenow Concentration Camp, Germany
- Education: University of Groningen
- Military career
- Allegiance: Netherlands
- Branch: Dutch resistance
- Service years: 1940–1945
- Awards: Dutch Cross of Resistance
- Other work: lawyer

Denis Claire Baudouin Mesritz (November 16, 1919 – March 16, 1945) was a Dutch lawyer. He studied law at the University of Groningen until 1942. Jean Mesritz was his brother.

Mesritz was born in The Hague. During the Second World War, Mesritz was active in the resistance. He was the founder of the underground newspaper De Toekomst “The Future” as well as being involved in “De Geus”, “Het Parool” and “Ons Volk”. In addition, he was an initiator of what would become the National Resistance Committee. On May 16, 1944, he was arrested by the Germans on the Amsterdam-Hague train. He died at the age of 25 in the concentration camp in Rathenow and is buried at Ereveld Loenen.

== Honours ==
He was posthumously awarded the Dutch Cross of Resistance.

"For in dangerous circumstances having shown courage, initiative, obstinacy, sacrifice and dedication in the battle against the oppressor of the Dutch independence and keeping up spiritual freedom, and so honoring in him one of the ways of resistance, that was shown in its many forms from 15th May 1940 until 5th May 1945 in growing manner inflicting damage to the enemies cause and having contributed in an unforgettable way to the liberation of the homeland."

— Royal Decree No. 17, dated 7th May 1946

Stolperstein for Denis C.B. Mesritz in Groningen

A Stolperstein was laid for him at Oostersingel 130b in Groningen.
