= Beatrix Campbell =

English writer and activist

Beatrix Campbell OBE
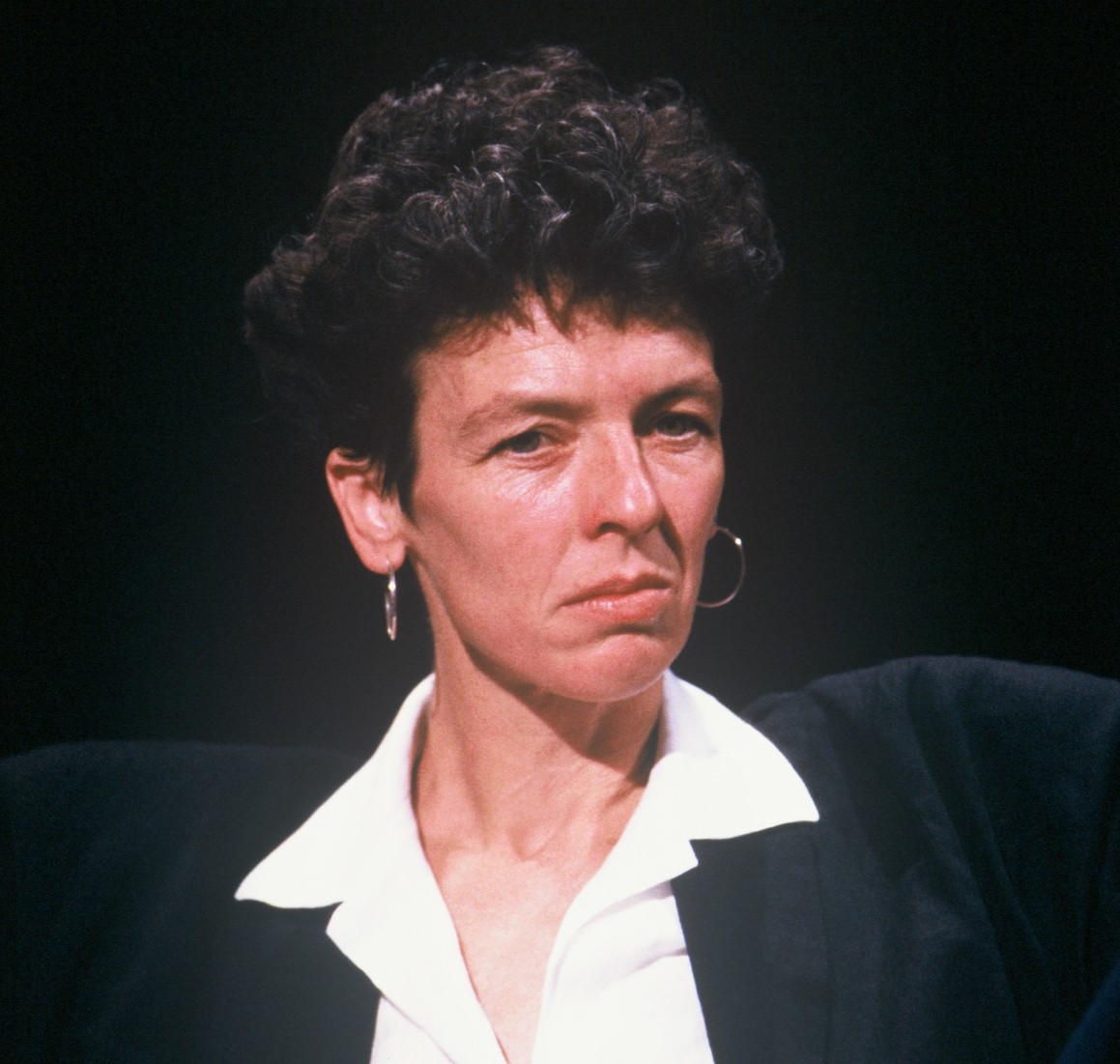
- Campbell in 1987
- Born: Mary Lorimer Beatrix Barnes; 3 February 1947 (age 79); Carlisle, England
- Notable work: Wigan Pier Revisited (1984);
- Political party: Green Party; Communist (before 1989)
- Movement: Marxist feminism
- Spouse: Bobby Campbell (div. 1978)
- Awards: Cheltenham Literature Festival Prize (1984); Fawcett Society Prize (1987)
- Website: beatrixcampbell.co.uk

Mary Lorimer Beatrix Campbell (née Barnes; born 3 February 1947) is an English writer and activist who has written for a number of publications since the early 1970s. Her books include Wigan Pier Revisited (1984), Goliath: Britain's Dangerous Places (1993) and Diana, Princess of Wales: How Sexual Politics Shook the Monarchy (1998). Campbell has also made films, including Listen to the Children (1990), a documentary about child abuse.

== Early life ==
Campbell was born in Carlisle, Cumberland, England. She was educated at Harraby Secondary Modern School and Carlisle and County High School for Girls (grammar school), since 2008 the Richard Rose Central Academy.

== Personal life ==
Beatrix Barnes took the name Beatrix Campbell on her marriage to Bobby Campbell, a former Glasgow shipyard fitter and fiddle player, who was part of the renaissance of radical politics and music in Scotland in the early 1960s. They met in London at the end of 1966 and lived in a commune in Tower Hamlets. They divorced in 1978, but remained close friends until his death in 1998. Bobby encouraged Beatrix to get a job in journalism, and she joined him at the communist daily The Morning Star, formerly The Daily Worker, where he was the boxing correspondent. She became a sub-editor and later a reporter. She became deeply committed to the women's liberation movement in 1970, and from that time was oriented towards women and women's issues. Having come out as a lesbian aged 23, Campbell subsequently married a woman, with no thought given, she stated, to the distinction between "civil partnership" and "marriage".

== Working and political life ==
Campbell was 14 years old when, in 1961, she took part in the Campaign for Nuclear Disarmament's march from Aldermaston to London in protest against nuclear weapons, and was still a teenager when she joined the Communist Party. At that time, the party was deeply divided over its relationship with the Soviet Union. She belonged to the party's anti-Stalinist wing that opposed the Soviet invasion of Czechoslovakia in 1968. In London, she and Bobby Campbell joined a dissident group within the Communist Party, founded by university lecturer Bill Warren, that produced a critique of both Stalinism and the party's economic policy.

From the early 1970s, Campbell's engagement with the Communist Party was increasingly as that of a feminist: from this perspective she challenged the tenets of the Communist Party, both its political approach to organising among women and its overall strategy. Geoff Andrews wrote of her opinions in his book End Games and New Times: The Final Years of British Communism 1964–1991 that feminism now "became a priority, not subordinate to some higher goal. It was a crucial part of redefining socialism". Campbell was one of a group of journalists on The Morning Star who in the early 1970s challenged the editor to break the paper's exclusive ties to the Communist Party and the trade union movement, and open a dialogue with newly emerging social movements. After the appointment of Tony Chater as editor in 1976, Campbell felt the struggle to reform the Star had been lost, and resigned, joining the journal Marxism Today and the Gramscian New Times.

By the end of the 1970s, Campbell was working principally for Time Out, whose staff were involved in a long strike and occupation in 1981 over equal pay for all and for the right of staff to be consulted about major investments. Ultimately, she and the majority of the staff left and started the cooperatively-owned London magazine City Limits.

The emergence of the women's liberation movement changed Campbell's life. With Nell Myers, she set up a women's liberation movement group in Stratford, East London, and in 1972 was in the group of women Communist Party members that founded the magazine Red Rag. It immediately opened itself up to women in the wider women's movement, describing itself not only as a Marxist but as a "feminist journal", and defining feminism as "the political movement which emerges as women's response to their own oppression". When the Communist Party banned Red Rag, the editorial collective's response was "it's not yours to ban", and the journal continued to flourish for ten years.

In the 1980s, Campbell's writing focused on the transformation of Britain by Thatcherism. She set off on a six-month journey around England and wrote a polemical critique of George Orwell's book The Road to Wigan Pier (1937) and what she saw as the myopia of sexist socialism. She investigated the Conservative Party's appeal to women. She also became associated politically and professionally with the emergence of radical municipalism, particularly in London, under the leadership of Labour's Ken Livingstone.

In 1998, Campbell reported on a Newcastle City Council report into allegations of child abuse at the Shieldfield Nursery in the city in 1993. She claimed the council inquiry was "stringent" and had found "persuasive evidence of sadistic and sexual abuse of up to 350 children". The alleged perpetrators were workers at the nursery, Dawn Reed and Christopher Lillie, who had already been cleared of multiple charges in a criminal trial in 1994. They subsequently successfully sued the Council, the "Independent Review Team" who produced the report, and the local Evening Chronicle newspaper for libel. Awarding Reed and Lillie the maximum possible damages of £200,000 each, the judge in the case made a "very rare" finding of "malice" on the part of the Independent Review Team, in that "they included in their report a number of fundamental claims which they must have known to be untrue and which cannot be explained on the basis of incompetence or mere carelessness." One of the four people on the Independent Review Team was Campbell's close working partner Judith Jones. Campbell also wrote in favour of now discredited allegations raised in the Cleveland Child sex abuse Scandal, as well as similar discredited allegations in Nottingham. On 9 February 1991, Campbell appeared on television discussion programme After Dark together with the then deputy director of Nottinghamshire social services Andy Croall and others.

Campbell stood twice as a Green Party candidate in local elections, (in the London Borough of Camden) and in the 2010 parliamentary election (in Hampstead and Kilburn constituency), where she obtained only 1.4% of the votes, the seat being held by Labour's Glenda Jackson. That year, following the cancellation of a Julie Bindel speech, Campbell wrote an opinion piece in support of Bindel, saying of the incident: "Transgender people who used to live as men and now live as women persuaded the May 2009 NUS women's conference to mandate its officers to share no platform with Julie Bindel." Campbell concluded:

The transgender vigilantes should listen up, wise up and grow up, participate in, not proscribe, the debate they started. And their best friends in the NUS should do what best friends do: tell them to stop it, their politics stink.

Campbell left the Green Party in 2020, citing policies on transgender issues. "Women's rights and resources are at grave risk, not only from the effects of 'austerity' funding regimes, but also from an extreme trans activism seeking to silence women and assail feminist organisations", Campbell wrote of the decision. She characterized identifying as transgender as "a kind of an exemplar of a neoliberal version of what it means to be human, at its most idiosyncratic, i.e. you can choose! You can choose to be anything you like," adding: "Well, I'm sorry, you can't."

== Honours and citations ==
Campbell has received several academic honours, including honorary doctorates conferred by Salford University, Oxford Brookes University and The Open University. Her work has gained her several awards, including the Cheltenham Literature Festival Prize in 1984 for the book Wigan Pier Revisited, the Fawcett Society Prize in 1987 for the book The Iron Ladies and the First Time Producers' Award in 1990 for her Dispatches documentary film Listen to the Children.

In June 2009, Campbell was appointed an OBE for "services to equal opportunities". Writing in The Guardian, she self-defined as a "republican with politics rooted in Marxism and feminism" and explained the apparent contradiction in accepting the award as:

By clinging to symbols and rituals that belong to a cruel imperial order the government compromises the gonged.

You ask yourself the question: how can I accept anything from this horrible imperial regime?

And yet, getting gonged confers recognition of "citizens" contributions' to a good society – in my case equality – and the gesture affirms our necessity; the radicals – not the royalists – are the best of the British.

In 2012, she was in the World Pride Power List of the 100 most influential gay people of the year.

== Selected publications ==
- Sweet freedom: the struggle for women's liberation (with Anna Coote), Blackwell, 1982.
- Wigan Pier Revisited: Poverty and politics in the Eighties, Virago Press, 1984.
- The Iron Ladies: Why Do Women Vote Tory?, Virago Press, 1987.
- Unofficial Secrets: Child Abuse – The Cleveland Case, Virago Press, 1988.
- Goliath: Britain's Dangerous Places, Methuen Books, 1993.
- Diana, Prinildren Cried (with Judith Jones), Oberon Books, 2005.
- Agreement: The Scess of Wales: How Sexual Politics Shook the Monarchy, Women's Press, 1998.
- And All the Chtate, Conflict and Change in Northern Ireland, Lawrence & Wishart, 2008.
- End of Equality, Seagull, 2014.
- Planet Patriarchy: Global Tales of Feminism and Oppression(with Rahila Gupta), C Hurst & Co Publishers Ltd, 2025. ISBN 978-1805262879
