= Mathilde Verspyck =

Freedom fighter during World War II

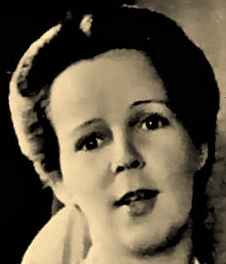
- Born: 16 June 1908; Semarang, Java
- Died: 11 February 1945 (aged 36); Ravensbrück Concentration Camp, Germany
- Occupations: Belgian Resistance, Dutch Resistance
- Awards: Verzetskruis 1940–1945 (Dutch Cross of Resistance 1940-1945); Medal of Freedom (United States)

Mathilde Adrienne Eugénie Verspyck (16 July 1908 – 11 February 1945) "was a brave woman who was a devoted believer in the cause of freedom, for which she later sacrificed her life," according to her U.S. Medal of Freedom award.

A committed freedom fighter who was actively involved with European resistance movements during World War II, Verspyck survived imprisonment at one Nazi concentration camp only to perish at another.

Arrested and jailed twice between 1941 and 1943 for her involvement with resistance work, she was arrested a third time in mid-April 1944 for sheltering and facilitating the escape of political prisoners and Allied pilots, as well as espionage. Jailed at the prison at Scheveningen, she was transported to Herzogenbusch (Vught) in the Netherlands two months later. Transferred to the Ravensbrück concentration camp in Germany three months later, she died there on 11 February 1945.

== Formative years ==
Born in Semarang, Java on 16 June 1908, Mathilde Verspyck (Dutch spelling "Verspijck") was a granddaughter of Rudolph Paul Verspyck (1837-1929), a prominent Dutch general, and the daughter of Rudolph Hubert Marie Verspyck (1869-1949), and his second wife, Mathilde Adrienne Prins. Her father, a native of Bergen op Zoom in the southern part of the Netherlands, was a partner in the leading brokerage firm of Dunlop & Kolff, which operated in the Dutch East Indies areas of Batavia, Semarang and Surabaya, trading in fish, sugar, tea and other high-demand goods. After her parents divorced sometime around 1920, her father then remarried in London, United Kingdom in 1921.

== World War II ==
Shortly after the invasion of the Netherlands by Germany and the subsequent surrender of Dutch troops on 14 May 1940, Verspyck began helping European resistance movements try to free political prisoners who had been sentenced to death, and also worked with the Comète escape line (Comet escape line) of the Belgian Resistance, sheltering allied pilots who had been shot down before also helping them to escape. The duties of Comet line members varied, but typically involved providing airmen and soldiers who had been trapped behind enemy lines with food, clothing and false identity papers, hiding them in attics or cellars, and/or guiding them through occupied France to neutral Spain, from where they were able to safely make their way to Great Britain and return to military service.

According to Dr. Bob de Graeff, professor of Intelligence and Security Studies in the department for History of International Relations at Utrecht University in the Netherlands, Verspyck was active with the Comet line in Brussels:

She had already been arrested in November 1941 but was released less than one year later. Fearlessly she resumed her underground activities but on 15 November 1943 once again found herself in the St. Gilles prison in Brussels. She was released again for the second time but on 12 April 1944 was imprisoned for the third time [alternate date: 15 April 1944]. Via the prison in Scheveningen Prison and thereafter the prison camp in Vught, she was sent to the women's concentration camp at Ravensbruck, where she died on 11 February 1945. Her father, who had also been taken prisoner, also survived the war.

Historian Megan Koreman has been able to confirm that two of the people with whom Verspyck worked as part of the Comet line were Jan Strengers, an "expatriate banker," and Paul Van Cleeff. Van Cleeff, whose aliases included "Meneer Paul, van Caneghem, Mertens, Charles Moermans," reportedly "passed aviators to Comet through Mae Verspyck and Jan Strengers before his arrest."

=== Resistance activities of Mathilde Verspyck's parents ===
According to Professor de Graeff, when Mathilda A. E. Verspyck was captured and imprisoned for her resistance activities, her father "had also been taken prisoner [but] survived the war."

In addition, Philippe Connart, Michel Dricot, Edouard Renière, and Victor Schutters, creators of the resistance research website, Le Réseau Comète (The Comet Network), have indicated that Mathilde A. E. Verspyck's mother, Mathilde Adrienne (Prins) Verspyck, may also have been involved in European resistance activities during World War II (or that the names of mother and daughter were periodically confused by historians and genealogical researchers over the years). Per their website's biographical sketch of Johan Jacob Greter, a 1936 Olympic silver medalist and member of the Netherlands military whose escape was facilitated by the Comet line [rough translation]:

Greter met with several individuals who were purportedly members of the resistance during the fall of 1943. On October 10, he then met with a dentist from Rotterdam, Dr. van der Nagel, who introduced him to the brother of Christiaan Lindemans, a Dutch double agent nicknamed "King Kong." Taken to meet "King Kong" the next day, Greter was directed to provide the Lindemans with 100 gulden each for false papers, which would enable him to reach Cherbourg, France and Spain via the Dutch-Paris escape line with the help of guides from the resistance. As the arrangements grew increasingly problematic over the next several weeks, Greter sought help elsewhere.

Constable Karst Smit, who was stationed at Baarle-Nassau, "fait donc passer Greter en Belgique et le remet au réseau Bravery via Mathilde "Mae" VERSPYCK (Néerlandaise, épouse divorcée de Rudolf VERSPYCK, Avenue Yvan Lutens, Woluwé-Saint-Pierre)" ["transferred Greter's case to the Belgian Resistance, and helped him connect with Mathilde 'Mae' VERSPYCK (Dutch, divorced wife of Rudolf VERSPYCK, Avenue Yvan Lutens, Woluwé-Saint-Pierre)"].

When Verspyck was arrested in October 1943 (her second arrest), Greter's case was then taken over by Simone Cambrelin, the wife of André Vaes, who hid him at their home in Antwerp before helping him make his way, via the Comète (Comet) escape line to Brussels. After further transfers between resistance members, Greter crossed the Pyrenees by the road of Saint-Jean-de-Luz and the Endarlaza footbridge with the help of Jean-François Nothomb and Florentino as part of the Comet line's 75th passage, which also included Geoffrey Madgett, Denny Hornsey, Leon MacDonald and George Gineikis. But the trip proved too arduous for Greter, who developed hypothermia; even though they could see the lights of Spain in the distance, the resistance guides chose to leave him behind near Vera de Bidasoa.

Greter, who recovered, was then given the pseudonym, "Evers," and brought back to the Netherlands in January 1944, traveling by submarine with other Dutch escapees from Gibraltar to England.

== Death ==
After surviving two months of imprisonment at Herzogenbusch (Vught) from April to June 1944, a concentration camp which was run by the Nazi Schutzstaffel (also known as the "SS"), Mathilde Verspyck was then transferred to the Ravensbrück concentration camp in Germany. Initially able to withstand the increasingly harsh treatment she received there, she was finally so exhausted that she died at Ravensbrück on 11 February 1945. Note: Although British intelligence agent Airey Neave stated in his 1954 book that Verspyck died on 11 May 1945, many other sources, including the Netherlands Institute for War Documentation, have confirmed that Verspyck's date of death was 11 February 1945.

== Awards ==
Mathilde Verspyck was posthumously accorded two major honors in recognition of her efforts as a freedom fighter during World War II – the:

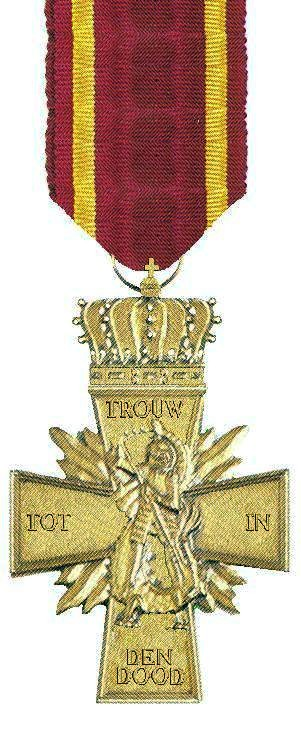
Verzetskruis, Robert Prummel, CC-BY-SA 3.0., 2006.

- Dutch Verzetskruis (Dutch Cross of Resistance) in 1946; and
- U.S. Medal of Freedom.

The Medal of Freedom, America's highest civilian honor, was conferred both for her resistance activities and for the imprisonment and death she suffered in relation to that work. According to the General Orders issued on 1 November 1946 and 20 March 1947 by the United States Department of Defense as part of this award:

Mademoiselle Verspyck joined an escape organization soon after the capitulation and is considered by the head of the group to have rendered considerable and remarkable service to his evasion line. Not only did she shelter numbers of evaders, but she also carried on considerable convoy activities. She was always a willing and tireless helper, who could be called upon to carry out a difficult and dangerous task at short notice.

Mademoiselle Verspyck was arrested on 15 April 1944 because of her evasion activities and transported to Vught (Holland) in June 1944. She was deported to Ravensbrück concentration camp on 6 September 1944, where she died on 11 February 1945 owing to the hardship and ill treatment to which she had been subjected.

Mademoiselle Verspyck was a brave woman who was a devoted believer in the cause of freedom, for which she later sacrificed her life.

The Verzetskruis, the second highest decoration for valor in the Netherlands (see image at right), was conferred for Verspyck's display of "moed, initiatef, volharding, offervaardigheid en toewigding in den strijd tegen den overweldiger van de Nederlandsche onafthankelijkheid " ("courage, initiation, perseverance, sacrifice and dedication in the struggle against the usurper of Dutch independence") and for helping to preserve the "geestelijke vrijheid" ("spiritual freedom") of those she rescued.

== External resources ==
- de Graeff, Bob. Schakels naar de vrijheid ("Stepping Stones to Freedom: Help to Allied Airmen in the Netherlands During World War II"). The Hague, Netherlands, 1995.
- Erelijst van gevallenen 1940-1945 (Honor Roll of the Fallen). Amsterdam: Netherlands Institute for War Documentation (NIOD).
- Plaque Honoring the World War Resistance Fighters Who Were Jailed at St. Gilles Prison. Brussels, Belgium: Brussels Remembers.
- Verspyck, Mathilde Adrienne Eugénie (biography). Badhoevedorp, Netherlands: Traces of War.
