= Jan Zwartendijk =

Dutch businessman and diplomat

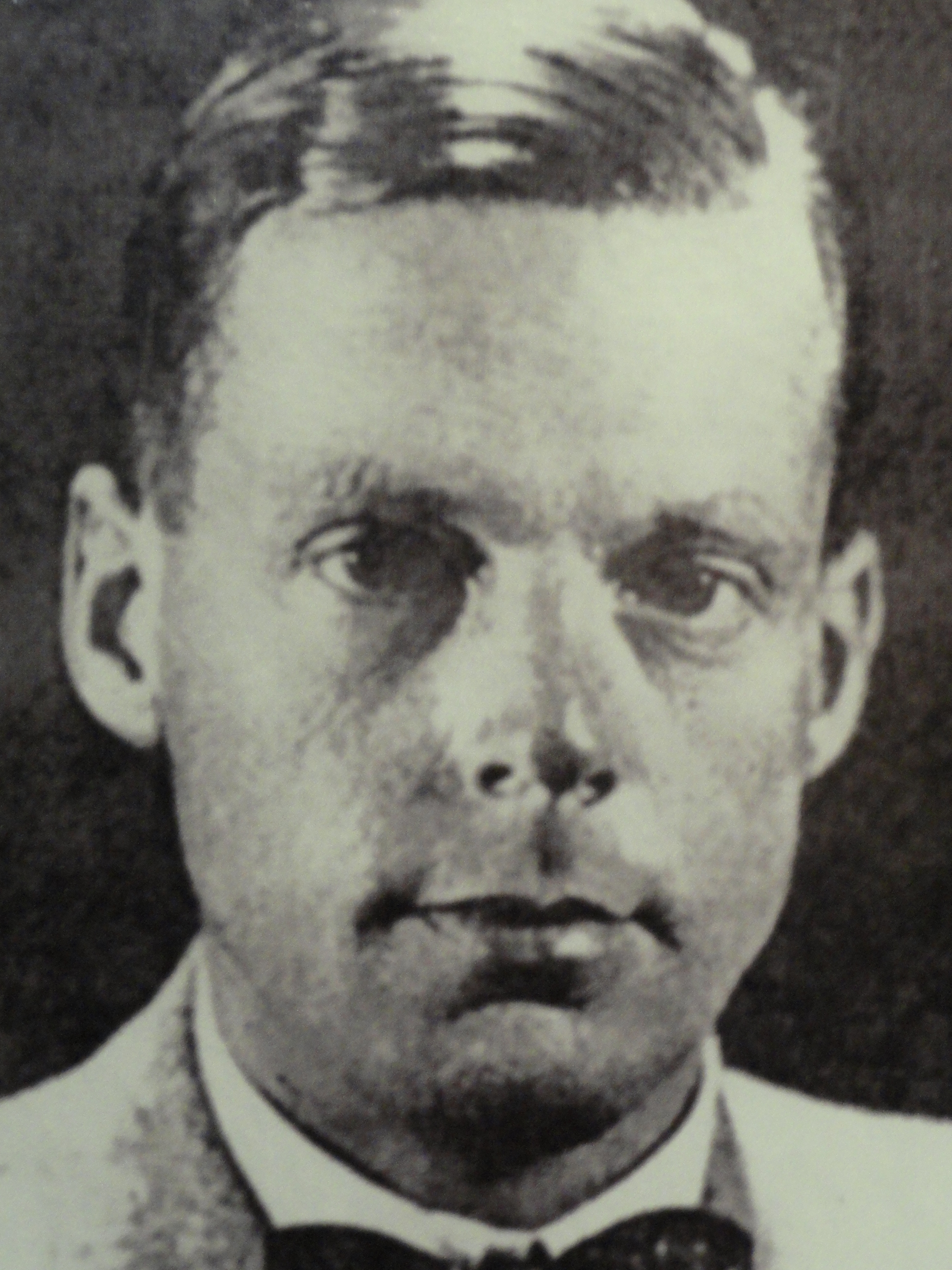
- Zwartendijk in 1941
- Born: 29 July 1896; Rotterdam, Netherlands
- Died: 14 September 1976 (aged 80); Eindhoven, Netherlands
- Occupations: Businessman, diplomat
- Known for: Helping Jews escape Lithuania during World War II

Jan Zwartendijk (29 July 1896 – 14 September 1976) was a Dutch businessman and diplomat. As director of the Philips factories in Lithuania and part-time acting consul of the Dutch government-in-exile, he supervised the writing of 2,345 visas for Curaçao to save Jews from the Holocaust during World War II. In 1997, Yad Vashem recognised him as Righteous Among the Nations.

== Early life ==
Zwartendijk was born in Rotterdam.

== World War II ==
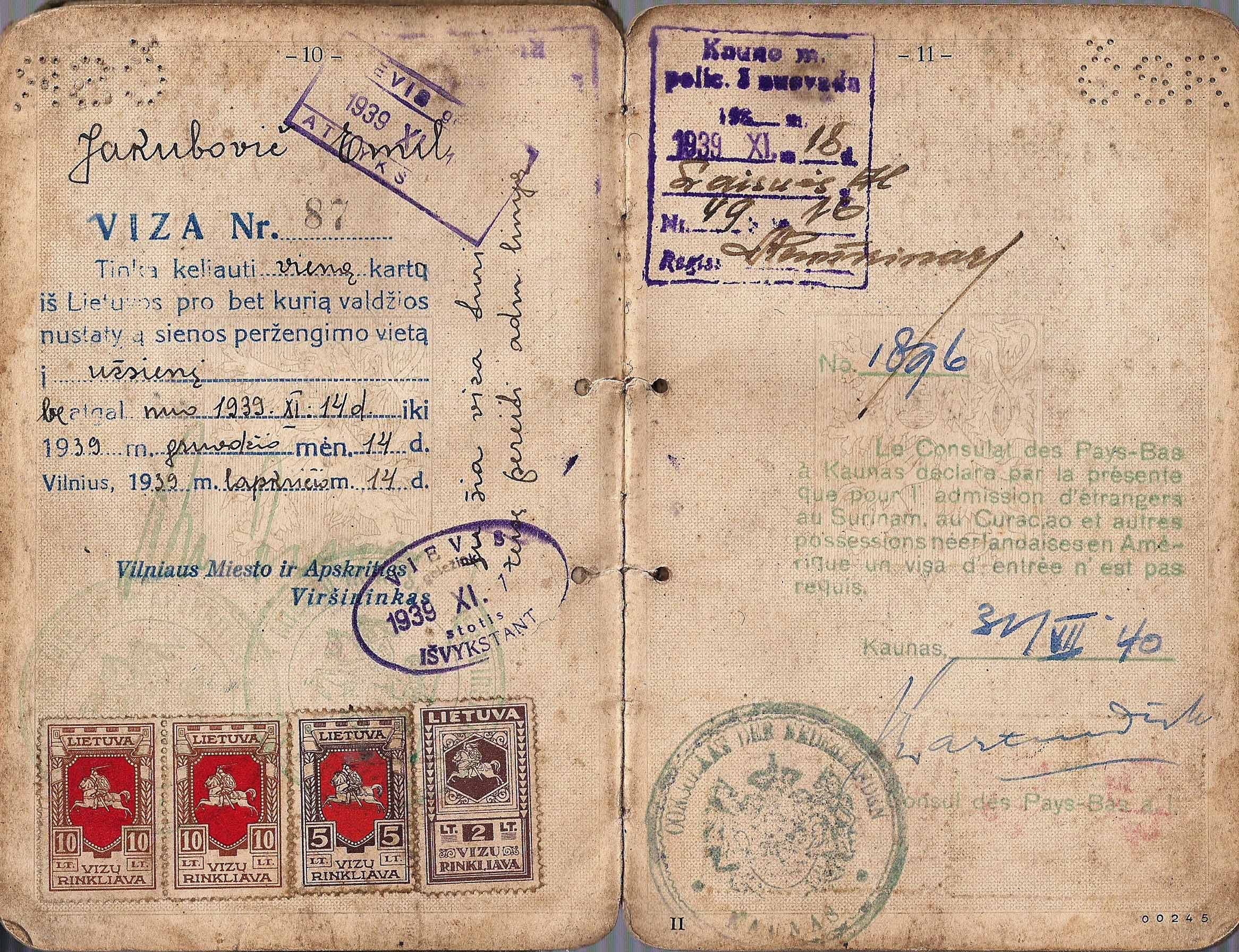
A visa from 1940 with Zwartendijk's signature

In 1939, he was appointed director of the Lithuanian branch of production of Philips. He also served as honorary consul for the Dutch government.

When the Soviet Union occupied Lithuania in 1940, Ambassador L.P.J. de Decker wrote a declaration on Nathan Gutwirth's and Pessie Lewin's passport stating that entering Curaçao and Dependencies in the West Indies did not require a visa, while omitting the part about the standard phrase "permission of the Governor of Curaçao is required". It is not clear if Gutwirth or Lewin suggested the omission. The idea of Curaçao possibly came up in correspondence between Mrs. Lewin and de Decker. She originally asked for a visa to the Dutch East Indies (now Indonesia). Zwartendijk was authorized or instructed by his superior, Ambassador to Latvia L.P.J. de Decker, to issue the same modified text to Jews who wished to escape from Lithuania. As the word spread many Jews in Kaunas (Kovno), Lithuania approached Zwartendijk to get a similar inscription in their passports so they could leave. With the help of aides, he produced over 2,000 passport inscriptions for Jews to Curaçao. Jews who had fled from German and Soviet-occupied Poland may have also sought his assistance.

Subsequently, refugees also approached Chiune Sugihara, a Japanese consul, who gave them a transit visa through Japan, despite his government's disapproval. This gave many refugees an opportunity to leave Lithuania for the Far East via the Trans-Siberian Railway.

In the three weeks after 16 July 1940, Zwartendijk wrote 2,345 passport inscriptions to Curaçao, and some of the Jews copied additional ones. Many who helped only knew him as "Mr Philips Radio". When the Soviet Union occupied Lithuania, they closed down his Philips office and the embassies and consulates in Kaunas on 3 August 1940. He returned to the occupied Netherlands to work in the Philips headquarters in Eindhoven until his retirement, and never talked about his actions in Lithuania. Zwartendijk died in Eindhoven in 1976.

== Awards ==
In 1996, Boys Town Jerusalem, an orphanage and vocational training school in Jerusalem, honoured Zwartendijk at a tribute dinner in New York City and announced the establishment of the Jan Zwartendijk Award for Humanitarian Ethics and Values. The award has since been bestowed on other Holocaust-era saviors, including President Manuel Luis Quezon and the people of the Republic of the Philippines.

In 1984 Yad Vashem bestowed the Righteous Among the Nations title on Chiune Sempo Sugihara and on Zwartendijk in 1997. De Decker was not awarded that recognition per the Righteous database updated to January 2022.

Also in 1997, Albany, New York erected a plaque honoring Zwartendijk in the city's Raoul Wallenberg Park. On 10 September 2012, he was awarded with the Life Saving Cross of the Republic of Lithuania, a decoration to award the persons who, despite danger to their lives, attempted to save life. In June 2018, a monument to Zwartendijk (about 2,000 LED rods connected into a 7-metre (23 ft) diameter spiral) was unveiled on Laisvės alėja, Kaunas by King Willem-Alexander of the Netherlands and President Dalia Grybauskaitė.

In 2023, he was awarded the Erepenning voor Menslievend Hulpbetoon (Honorary Medal for Charitable Assistance), the highest possible non-military award, by the Dutch government.

== Popular culture ==
In 2018 Dutch author Jan Brokken published De Rechtvaardigen ('The Just'), a book describing the rescue operation and Zwartendijk's life. The title refers to all diplomats involved in the rescue operation.

In the novel The Amazing Adventures of Kavalier & Clay by Michael Chabon, it is implied that the protagonist Josef Kavalier receives visas from Zwartendijk and his ally Chiune Sugihara. Though the novel does not mention these men by name, it describes a "Dutch consul in Kovno who was madly issuing visas to Curaçao, in league with a Japanese official who would grant rights of transit" (p. 65).

Zwartendijk is also portrayed in the 2015 Japanese film biography of Sugihara, Persona Non Grata.

In 2022, the monument Loom Light created by Titia Ex was unveiled in Eindhoven, the Netherlands, in commemoration of Zwartendijk and regional resistance fighters.

== See also ==
- Mir Yeshiva (Belarus)
- Thomas Hildebrand Preston, 6th Baronet
- Frits Philips
