= Honorary Medal for Charitable Assistance =

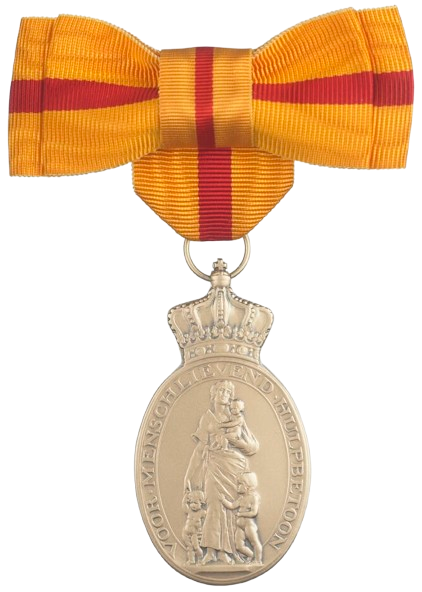
- The silver Honorary Medal for Charitable Assistance on a Lady's bow
- Type: Civil decoration, with degrees gold, silver or bronze medal
- Awarded for: Charitable assistance
- Presented by: Kingdom of the Netherlands
- Status: Currently awarded
- Established: 18 June 1822
- First award: Lieutenant Alexander de Langle
- Ribbon bar of the golden honorary medal

Precedence
- Next (higher): Gold: Dutch Cross of Resistance; Silver and Bronze: Airman's Cross
- Next (lower): Gold: Order of the Netherlands Lion; Silver and Bronze: KNMI Medal

The Honorary Medal for Charitable Assistance (Dutch: Erepenning voor Menslievend Hulpbetoon) was created at 18 June 1822 and is after the Military William Order the oldest decoration for bravery in the Kingdom of the Netherlands. Furthermore, the Honorary Medal is the highest civilian decoration still being awarded for bravery, and is specifically for those who carried out a voluntary act of bravery or self-sacrifice, with an emphasis on charity.

The medal can be awarded in gold, silver or bronze. Awarding is on basis by nomination of the Netherlands government and by royal decree. The golden medal has precedence only after the Dutch Cross of Resistance (also a civilian bravery decoration, but not awarded anymore), and the silver and bronze medals have precedence after the Airman's Cross (a military bravery award).

== History of the medal ==
Lieutenant Alexander de Langle was the first person to be rewarded with this medal in 1821 for rescuing a sergeant who was stuck at the bottom of a well. Although this was considered an act of bravery, King William I did not deem it important enough to award the lieutenant the distinguished Military William Order, so instead a new award for bravery was created: the Honorary Medal for Charitable Assistance.

The first medal was roundish and showed the portrait of King William I. At the reverse side a laurel wreath was portrayed and some space was reserved for an inscription. The medal was not meant to be worn. The size of the medal was related to the value of the metal used: a diameter of 50, 41 or 35 millimeter for subsequently a bronze, silver or golden medal.

In 1825 King William I decided that noble and charitable acts of Dutchmen were to be awarded by charitable organisations and the acts of foreigners and soldiers by the king himself.

In 1837 King William II decided by royal decree that the size of the golden, silver and bronze medals would be all 50 millimeter. Also his portrait was put on the medals.

Since 1849 the portrait of King William III was shown on the medals and from 1875 a portrait of the older and bald King William III.

When Emma of Waldeck and Pyrmont became the queen regent of the Netherlands she decided to put on the medal the portrait of her minor daughter Queen Wilhelmina. In 1897 a new type of medal was created, the medal did get a ribbon to wear and also did get the same shape as the French "Medal of Saint Helena".

Since 1912 the medal has its current shape. The medal is ovally shaped with at the top a stylised royal crown. On the medal a mother with three children is portrayed. The motif is taken from the city hall in Bolsward. At the reverse side the words "De koningin aan" (English: The Queen Rewards to) and also some space is reserved for an inscription. The medal is worn with an orange ribbon that has a red band in the middle. The medallion is today still award as gold, silver or bronze.

By decree on 15 April 1952 it was decided that the golden honorary medal has precedence just below the Dutch Cross of Resistance; herewith the golden Honorary Medal for Charitable Assistance is one of the highest awards in the Netherlands. The silver and bronze honorary medals has lower precedence after the Airman's Cross.

Before or since World War II it was common to award the medal to sailors. During World War II the medal was primarily award by the Dutch government in exile to those British sailors who rescued Dutch victims from drowning by a shipwreck.

After the war the medal was significantly less awarded. In 1982 a soldier of the Royal Netherlands Air Force received the bronze medal, and in 2005 two silver medals were awarded to rescuers of the Royal Netherlands Sea Rescue Institution.

Silver medals were awarded on 29 May 2008 by the then Dutch Minister of Defence Eimert van Middelkoop to five members of the Search and Rescue squadron 7 of the Royal Netherlands Navy, this because they saved the life of the captain and coxswain of an Iranian container ship.

In 2023, the gold medal was awarded posthumously to Jan Zwartendijk for creating visas for Lithuanian Jews.

== Notable recipients ==
- 2023, Medal in gold: Jan Zwartendijk (posthumous), for saving thousands of Jewish refugees in 1940.
