= Sir Alfred Bower, 1st Baronet =

British businessman

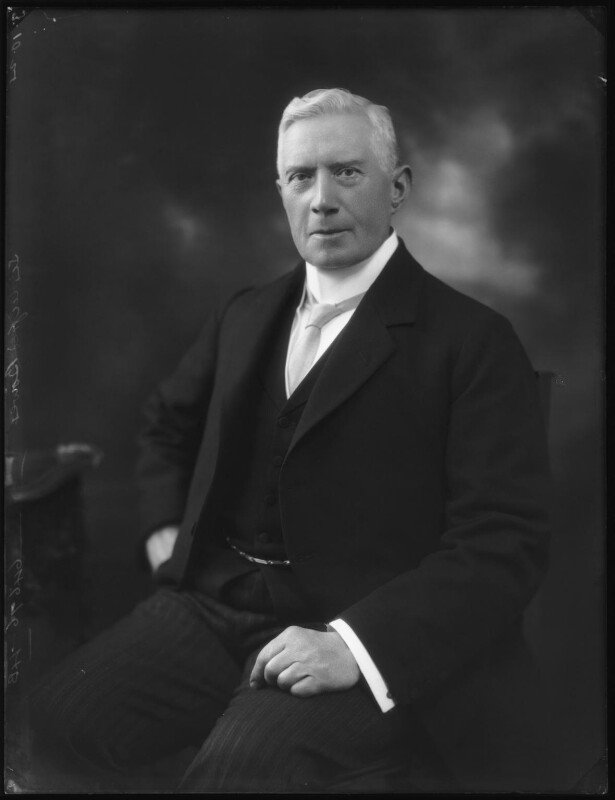
Bower in 1924

Sir Alfred Louis Bower, 1st Baronet (8 October 1858 – 16 November 1948), was a British businessman.

Bower was the founder of Bower and Company, wine merchants. He was elected a Sheriff of London in 1912–13 and was knighted on 13 October 1913.

His company was renamed El Vino so he could serve as an Alderman and then Lord Mayor of London between 1924 and 1925. He was created a baronet of Chislehurst in the County of Kent on 19 October 1925.

He had one child, Mona Elizabeth Blackett Bower (1903–55), who married James Mitchell (1889–1981). They were the parents of Sir David Bower Mitchell.

Bower died in November 1948, aged 90, when the title became extinct.

Arms: Per pale vert and sable, two longbows bent palewise in fesse or, on a chief of the last a Sword point to the dexter of the second. Crest: On the wreath of the colours, a bowman in armour, holding in the hands a drawn bow proper. Motto: "Ad metam"

Honorary titles
Preceded by Sir Louis Newton, 1st Baronet	Lord Mayor of London; 1924–1925	Succeeded by Sir William Pryke, 1st Baronet
Baronetage of the United Kingdom
New creation	Baronet (of Chislehurst); 1925–1948	Extinct
