= Jean Mesritz =

Jean Claire Adrien Mesritz (2 March 1918 – 31 March 1945) was a Dutch Resistance Fighter during World War II. He was the elder brother of Denis Mesritz.

Mesritz was born in The Hague. At the outbreak of the war, Mesritz was a student at Leiden University, a member of the Student Corps and a junior commissioned officer (Kornet) in the Mounted Artillery. On 13 August 1940, he tried to hijack the Scheveningen logger SCH 107 to sail to England, along with Erik Michielsen and Carel Kranenburg. This plan failed because the ship had already been requisitioned by the Germans.

He then arranged to be picked up on the Tjeukemeer in Friesland by an RAF seaplane on 13 October, with Marion Smit, Hans Hers, Lodewijk van Hamel and Lourens Baas Becking. The plane was from the 320 Dutch Squadron RAF commanded by Heije Schaper. This attempt was foiled by fog.

On the second attempt on 15 October, the aircraft was shelled on the water by German anti-aircraft guns. The plane managed to take off again and escape, but the resistance fighters were arrested and transferred to the detention center in Leeuwarden, and from there to the Oranjehotel. They were tried in April 1941. Van Hamel was sentenced to death, and Hers to life. Mesritz was sentenced to three years in prison.

On the day of his release he was told that he was now in protective custody, and stayed in custody until his death. On 5 June 1943, Mesritz was transferred to the Vught concentration camp, where he meets Professor Cleveringa, with whom he was imprisoned in the Oranjehotel, and is able to help him a little.

Eventually he ended up in Neuengamme concentration camp where he worked in the horse stables. He died at Neuengamme on 31 March 1945.

== Representation ==
In the film Soldier of Orange, the role of Jean Mesritz is played by Huib Rooymans. The character's name is Jan Weinberg. Contrary to reality, he is shot in the film.

== Memorial ==
A stolperstein was laid in his memory in Leiden on 2026-11-11
