= Richard Schoemaker =

Dutch fencer (1886–1942)

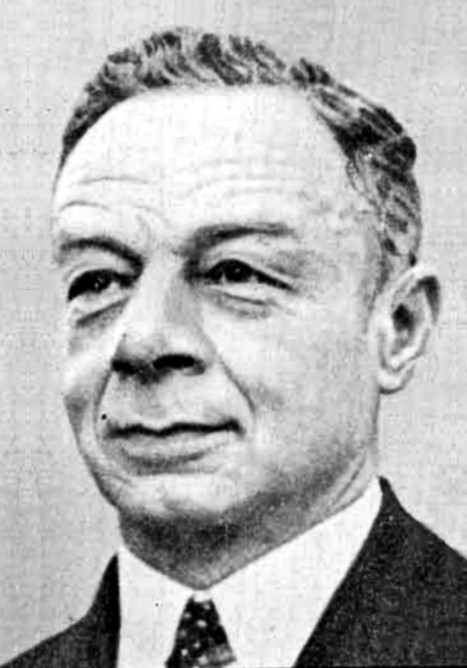
- Prof. ir. R.L.A. Schoemaker

Personal information
- Born: 5 October 1886 Roermond, Netherlands
- Died: 3 May 1942 (aged 55) Sachsenhausen, Germany

Sport
- Sport: Fencing

Richard Leonard Arnold Schoemaker (5 October 1886 – 3 May 1942) was a Dutch Olympic fencer, engineer in the Royal Netherlands East Indies Army, professor of architecture at Bandung Institute of Technology and Delft University of Technology, and leader of a resistance group during World War II, for which he was executed at the Sachsenhausen concentration camp.

He competed in the individual sabre event at the 1908 Summer Olympics. He was one of 95 people who, most posthumously, received the Dutch Cross of Resistance. The street forming the eastern border of the Delft University campus is named Schoemakerstraat after him.
