= Red Rag (magazine) =

Defunct British socialist feminist magazine

Red Rag: A Magazine of Women's Liberation was a British socialist feminist magazine published between 1972 and 1980.

== History ==
The magazine was produced by a Marxist collective, not aligned to any political party. Though it originated among London members of the Communist Party of Great Britain (CPGB), the editors called for "total democracy" and involved feminist contributors from outside the party. This pluralism led to CPGB disquiet after the first issue appeared, and the party withdrew funding and expelled the magazine's editorial board. The magazine's editorial collective responded that "it's not yours to ban".

Red Rag, "lively and often irreverent", pressed for activism on a host of issues affecting women:

The journal's writers called for the expansion of feminist solidarity through strike support for women workers; the organization of women workers such as night cleaners and nursery school staff; collective bargaining tactics that aim to lift working women out of poverty and to establish maternity rights and affirmative action programs; and trade union support for childcare, abortion rights, and ampaigns against domestic violence.

Writers included Beatrix Campbell, Sue Slipman, Sheila Rowbotham, Audrey Wise, Rosalind Delmar and Selma James.
