= Women's Report =

UK feminist newspaper published 1972–1979

Front cover of last issue ever produced

Women's Report was a second wave, feminist, bi-monthly newspaper published in the UK from 1972 to 1979 with international subscribers. In the spirit of the women's consciousness-raising groups of the 1960s and 70s, Women's Report was put together by a small, democratic group of unpaid women without a lead editor, editorial assistant, regular columnists, feature writers, hierarchy, commercial advertising, background capital or party-political affiliation. Non-profit and self-financing, it set out to relay information and report news and events not covered in the UK national press; to comment on reported events which were of relevance to women; and, by collecting the news and information into a single publication to give them more impact and heighten women's awareness of their position in society. Women's Report was part of the array of crucial communication tools, used by feminists, that underpinned the Women's liberation movement.

== History ==
Members of the Fawcett Society and other women formed the Women's Lobby, an extra-parliamentary lobbying group, to support the anti-sex discrimination legislation which was passed eventually in 1975 as the Sex Discrimination Act. The Women's Lobby turned into a magazine collective and produced the first issues of Women's Report. Members of the collective scanned the mainstream press and other news sources for items of interest to women. The aim was to monitor the state of women's affairs in family and marriage law, and social policy. It was then decided to have a visual arts/media section called 'Images' for which Griselda Pollock was responsible. The magazine also included short book reviews, information on groups and events and usually a feature article too.

By Jan–Feb 1974 (Volume 2 Issue 2) the magazine was being produced by The Women's Report Collective. Volunteers summarised, classified and discussed items of news every week for pages in the magazine headed Home, Legal, Work, Education, Mind and Body, Image/Art/Culture and Events. Extra research was carried out, articles debated, rewritten and edited in the collective, before being typed up, cut out, laid out on paper grids and pasted up with glue to make the original paper copy which was then litho-printed.

No bylines were ever added as the venture was wholly collaborative. The magazine was made easy to read by its non-corporate design, and by the addition of light-hearted comment and cartoons. After the printing, 2–3,000 copies were collated by hand, and copies posted to subscribers and bookshops at a cost of 30p a copy. Subscriber lists, business and accounts were also managed by members of the collective. The last issue produced was Volume Seven, Number Four, June–July 1979.

Angela Phillips, Griselda Pollock, Mary Chamberlain, Mandy Merck, Anna Coote, Pat Kahn, Cora Kaplan, Jane Caplan, Lindsay Mackie, Eileen Meredith, Diana Kahn, Jill Rakussen, Matilde Sandberg, Gail Chester were members of the original collective, Rachel Bodle and Zaidie Parr were part of the collective later, and went on to work on other periodicals and to contribute further to feminist thought. Issues of the periodical were sent to the British Library. Incomplete sets are now archived in Bristol and in the archives of the Feminist Library.

== Context of rise and demise of Women's Report ==
The development of offset printing, which made printing easier and cheaper, had led, in the 1960s, to the development of an "underground press" spreading a counter culture. In the wake of this underground press, feminists were inspired to produce their own organs of information to inform women of the Women's Liberation Movement activities and make women aware of their oppression. Women's Report was one of the first women's liberation publications in the UK. The Women's liberation movement had held four national conferences but, as yet, there were few specialist campaigning groups working on issues such as health and safety at work, media images of women, or rape.

In 1975, at the Women's Liberation Movement conference in Manchester, it was decided to set up a Women's Information and Referral Enquiry Service (WIRES) with a newsletter titled WIRES to collect and disseminate information pertaining to women's groups throughout the country.

By 1979 many local newsletters and campaign groups had emerged. Spare Rib magazine, appearing monthly and available through newsagents such as W H Smith, offered a familiar magazine format but an alternative to traditional magazines like Woman and Woman's Own which focused on women's domestic roles. Women's Report had lost volunteers and was also having trouble attracting new members to its hardworking collective so the decision was made to close.

== Bibliography ==
- Our Bodies Ourselves: A Health Book by and for Women by Angela Phillips and Jill Rakusen (1978). Penguin Books ISBN 9780140044300
- "How to start your own consciousness-raising group". Cwluherstory.com. The Chicago Women's Liberation Institution. 1971. Archived from the original (Leaflet) on 12 February 2004. Retrieved 18 February 2015.
