= Eldred Tabachnik =

British lawyer

Eldred Tabachnik QC (born 5 November 1943, died 29 November 2020) was an English barrister, recorder and a former president of the Board of Deputies of British Jews. He was President of the British Friends of Boys Town Jerusalem.

After reading law at the University of Cape Town, he qualified as an advocate at the South African Bar. He came to England and gained an LLM with distinction for commercial law and restitution. He then lectured in law at University College, London. He was called to the Bar in 1970, and was appointed QC in 1982. He was appointed Master of the Bench of the Inner Temple in 1982, and a Recorder in 2000. He was then part of 11 King's Bench Walk Chambers (11KBW) in London.

He covered a range of employment law from judicial review and public law, to commercial law. He wrote on legal subjects and was on the committee of the Industrial Relations Law Review. He was president of the Board of Deputies of British Jews from 1994 to 2000. Tabachnik was a friend of the British prime minister Tony Blair (who trained at 11KBW) and the fundraiser and businessman Lord Levy. Tabachnik praised Blair for his plans to create an annual Holocaust Memorial Day on 27 January, stating "It is essential that we remember the genocides of the last century and learn their lessons for the future."
