= Alfred Wintle =

Recipient of the Military Cross

Alfred Daniel Wintle MC
- Born: 30 September 1897; Mariupol, East Ukraine
- Died: 11 May 1966 (aged 68); Wrotham, Kent, England
- Spouse: Dora Wintle (m. 1944)
- Military career
- Allegiance: United Kingdom
- Branch: British Army
- Service years: 1916–1945
- Rank: Lieutenant Colonel
- Nickname: A. D. Wintle
- Units: Royal Artillery; 1st The Royal Dragoons
- Known for: Imprisonment in the Tower of London; Wintle v Nye House of Lords case; London eccentric
- Conflicts: First World War; Second World War; Syria–Lebanon campaign
- Awards: Military Cross
- Other work: Author; Parliamentary candidate

Lieutenant Colonel Alfred Daniel Wintle MC, better known as A. D. Wintle, (30 September 1897 – 11 May 1966) was a British Army officer who served in the First and Second World Wars. He was the first non-lawyer to achieve a unanimous verdict in his favour in the House of Lords, and is considered one of London's greatest eccentrics.

== Early life ==
The son of John Edward Wintle, a diplomat, and his wife Emma Teresa (née King), Alfred Daniel Wintle was born in Mariupol, East Ukraine. In 1901, the family went to live in Dunkirk; he was subsequently educated in France and Germany, becoming fluent in French and German.

== First World War ==
At the outbreak of the First World War, 16-year-old Wintle was in Dunkirk and claimed to have "irregularly attached" himself to Commander Charles Rumney Samson's armoured-car unit, witnessing Uhlans being shot on one occasion in Belgium. Wintle wished to see military action. In summer 1915, his father agreed to his son's early entry into the Royal Military Academy, Woolwich. He was commissioned in May 1916 in the Royal Garrison Artillery. Less than a week later, he was at the front. On his first night a shell burst near him, splashing over him the entrails of his sergeant (to whom he had just been introduced). Wintle later admitted to being petrified. As the bombardment continued, he dealt with his fear by standing at attention and saluting. As he later wrote, "Within thirty seconds I was able to become again an Englishman of action and to carry out calmly the duties I had been trained to perform".

Wintle saw action at Ypres, the Somme, La Bassée and Festubert, supposedly capturing the village of Vesle single-handedly before handing it over to the New Zealanders (who were about to attack it in force). During the Third Battle of Ypres in 1917, as he helped manhandle an 18-pounder field gun across a "crater-swamp", the gun-carriage wheel hit an unexploded shell; he woke up in a field hospital without his left eye, one kneecap and several fingers. At age 19, Wintle's right eye was so damaged that he wore a monocle for the rest of his life.

Wintle was sent back to England to convalesce by the "infernal quacks"; it appeared that his war was over but Wintle had other ideas. He was soon planning his escape from the Southern General Hospital back to the front, attending a nurses-only dance in their billets (disguised as a nurse) before finally making his escape. He recorded that his monocle was a dead give-away and the particularly unpleasant matron was unimpressed with his antics.

Wintle entrained for France with a warrant signed by a friend of his father's; he had a "moderately successful year of action" with the 119th Battery, 27th Brigade, Royal Field Artillery (RFA). His Military Cross was gazetted in The London Gazette of 2 April 1919, and the citation was published on 10 December. According to his obituary, he received his MC in the mail the same day it was announced in The London Gazette. The citation read:

For marked gallantry and initiative on 4th November, 1918, near Jolimetz. He went forward with the infantry to obtain information, and personally accounted for thirty-five prisoners. On 9th November, 1918, he took forward his section well in front of the infantry, and throughout the day he showed initiative of a very high order and did excellent work.

== Interwar years ==
Wintle is said to have regarded the period between the First and Second World War as "intensely boring". He remained in the army as a cavalry officer. For four years he was seconded as an instructor in English at a French military school.

== Second World War ==
When the Second World War began in September 1939, Wintle tried everything to persuade his superiors to allow him to go to France. When they refused, he planned to resign his commission and form his own army "to take the war to the Hun".

In his book Most Secret War, Reginald Victor Jones recalls encountering Wintle on matters of air intelligence. He was impressed by an army officer with enough technical knowledge to distinguish a spectroscope from a spectrograph, and who noted details in intelligence reports which might have indicated their authenticity (or otherwise). After chatting with Wintle on Horse Guards Parade one morning, he recorded that he was surprised to see a news headline a few days later: "Cavalry Officer in the Tower".

After the French surrender, Wintle demanded an aircraft (with which he intended to rally the French Air Force to fly their planes to Britain and continue fighting Germany from British air bases); when refused, he threatened an RAF officer (Air Commodore A. R. Boyle) with a gun. It was alleged that he had threatened to shoot himself and Boyle, and for this he was imprisoned in the Tower of London. On the way to his prison, the lieutenant colonel was escorted by a young soldier via train. The soldier is reported to have lost the travel warrant; disgusted by this, Wintle declared the man incompetent, told him to wait where he was and went to get a new warrant. Since there was no other officer of higher rank at the warrant office, he signed the paper himself. Of his time in the Tower, he wrote:

My life in the Tower had begun. How different it was from what I had expected. Officers at first cut me dead, thinking that I was some kind of traitor; but when news of my doings leaked out they could not do enough for me. My cell became the most popular meeting place in the garrison and I was as well cared for as if I had been at the Ritz. I would have a stroll in the (dry) moat after breakfast for exercise. Then sharp at eleven Guardsman McKie, detailed as my servant, would arrive from the officers' mess with a large whisky and ginger ale. He would find me already spick and span, for though I have a great regard for the Guards, they have not the gift to look after a cavalry officer's equipment. The morning would pass pleasantly. By noon visitors would begin to arrive. One or two always stayed to lunch. They always brought something with them. I remember one particularly succulent duck in aspic – it gave me indigestion – and a fine box of cigars brought by my family doctor. Tea time was elastic and informal. Visitors dropped in at intervals, usually bringing along bottles which were uncorked on the spot. I don't recall that any of them contained any tea. Dinner, on the other hand, was strictly formal. I dined sharp at eight and entertained only such guests as had been invited beforehand. After a few days of settling in, I was surprised to find that – as a way of life – being a prisoner in the Tower of London had its points.

When his case was heard, Wintle was read the three charges against him. The first was that he had feigned defective eyesight (and infirmity, to avoid active duty). This charge was dismissed after Wintle's defence provided medical evidence.

The second charge was assaulting Air Commodore Boyle, and the third was conduct contrary to (and to the prejudice of) good order and military discipline. To the latter was added the claim that he had drawn a gun in the presence of the RAF officer, and stated that "people like you ought to be shot". Jones recalled that far from denying this, Wintle admitted the act and produced a list of people whom he felt should likewise be shot as a patriotic gesture. The list must have been a topical one; after he had read out the sixth name upon it (Leslie Hore-Belisha, then Secretary of State for War), that charge was also dropped. The government, embarrassed by his accusations, upheld the court decision to drop all charges bar one: the assault on Air Commodore Boyle (for which Wintle received a formal reprimand). Jones went on to add that Wintle was in the relatively safe position of being tried by an Army court-martial on charges brought by the RAF.

Wintle was then sent abroad to rejoin his old regiment (1st The Royal Dragoons), and went into action gathering intelligence and coordinating raids on the Vichy French in Syria. After the Allied victory in Syria, Wintle was asked to go to Vichy France in disguise to determine the condition of British prisoners-of-war held there. While waiting to make contact with sympathetic elements of the Vichy French government Wintle was betrayed, arrested as a spy and imprisoned by the Vichy.

During his captivity, Wintle informed his guards that it was his duty as an English officer to escape; he successfully did so once by unhinging his cell door and hiding in a sentry box before slipping out quietly, but was betrayed and recaptured within a week. Wintle's guard was doubled from this point on. He responded by going on a 13-day hunger strike in protest against the "slovenly appearance of the guards who are not fit to guard an English officer!" He also informed anyone who would listen (including Maurice Molia, the camp commandant) exactly how he felt about their cowardice and treachery to their country. He informed them that he still intended to escape, and that anyone who called himself a Frenchman would come with him. Shortly after, he sawed through the iron bars of his cell, hid in a rubbish cart, and slipped over the wall of the castle, making his way back to Britain via Spain. Molia later claimed on Wintle's This Is Your Life programme in 1959 that shortly after the escape, "because of Wintle's dauntless determination to maintain English standards and his constant challenge to our authority" the entire garrison of 280 men had gone over to the Resistance.

== Postwar years ==
Wintle had married his wife, Dora, in 1944. After the war, he stood as a Liberal Party candidate for the 1945 general election at Norwood. The seat had little in terms of a Liberal voting tradition, and he finished third with about 11 percent of the vote.

The editor of The Times preserved a letter that Wintle sent him in 1946:

Sir,
I have just written you a long letter.
On reading it over, I have thrown it into the waste paper basket.
Hoping this will meet with your approval,
I am, Sir,
Your obedient Servant,
AD Wintle

He was once so furious about the lack of first-class carriages on a train that he commandeered the engine and refused to move until more carriages appeared.

Wintle made legal history when he brought a legal action against a dishonest solicitor named Nye, whom he accused of appropriating £44,000 from the estate of Wintle's deceased cousin, by inveigling her into leaving the residue of her estate to Nye in her will. To publicise the case, in 1955 Wintle served time in prison after forcing Nye to remove his trousers and submit to being photographed. He pursued Nye through the courts over the next three years, losing his case on two occasions. By 1958, Wintle ran out of money and had to present the case himself. On 26 November 1958 the Lords announced that they had found for Wintle, the reasons for judgement being reserved. In its subsequent written reasons, the House of Lords held that the burden was on the solicitor Nye to establish that the gift of the residue of the deceased cousin's estate to the solicitor in the will that he had drawn was not the result of his fraud, and that he had failed to discharge this exceptionally heavy burden so that the trial jury's validation of the gift to Nye could not be allowed to stand. Wintle thus became the first non-lawyer to achieve a unanimous verdict in his favour in the House of Lords.

A comprehensive analysis of the legal issues in the Wintle v Nye lawsuit is provided by Kerridge in "Wills made in Suspicious Circumstances: the Problem of the Vulnerable Testator". The author provides a brief overview of the factual background to the case and a discussion of the procedural difficulties faced by Wintle in prosecuting the civil case. The author suggests the ultimate victory by Wintle was the "right result by the wrong route", because at the time of the appeal to the House of Lords "everyone was mindful of the newspaper headlines"; he suggests that the Law Lords were forced to resort to sophistry to uphold Wintle's appeal, and concludes that it "is a case which has haunted this branch of the law for a generation". Nevertheless, it could also be said that the House of Lords decision is consistent with long standing principles and authority that a person in a fiduciary position such as a solicitor should not be permitted to benefit from abusing that relationship, particularly in the case of an elderly client "unversed in business" like the testator in this case. Although Wintle lost his case on the first appeal, Lord Justice Sellers (one of the three judges on the Court of Appeal) dissented and considered that he should have won it. Thus, of the nine judges who heard the case at its various stages, six sided with Wintle.

An encounter with Wintle in the El Vino wine bar on Fleet Street is related in a letter to the editor of The Spectator published 8 May 1999. The heading was "Bower's bans" (Letters to the Editor, The Spectator, 8 May 1999):

From Mr Tom Pocock

Sir:
Frank Bower was not always able to eject unwanted patrons from El Vino (Letters, 1 May). One morning in the late Fifties, a West Indian workman entered what he thought was a pub and asked the proprietor for a pint of bitter. Empurpled with rage, embroidered waistcoat at bursting point, Bower was hustling him into Fleet Street when interrupted by a crisp military command from the back of the bar: 'That gentleman is a friend of mine. I have been expecting him. Kindly show him to my table.' Colonel Wintle – celebrated for inspecting the turn out of his German (Note: in reality, they had been Vichy-French) guards when a prisoner of war and for debagging a solicitor – had spoken.

Rising to greet his guest, Wintle trained his monocle on Bower and ordered, 'Pray bring us two small glasses of white wine.' When this had been drunk and a convivial conversation concluded, the Colonel and his new friend rose, shook hands and went their separate ways.
Tom Pocock
22 Lawrence Street, London SW3

He was the subject of This Is Your Life in 1959 when he was surprised by Eamonn Andrews at London's Hay's Wharf.

Wintle died in May 1966 aged 68 at his home in Wrotham, Kent, and was cremated at Maidstone Crematorium, although he had wanted a funeral at Canterbury Cathedral with a full church service and the 1st The Royal Dragoons on parade playing "My Old Tarpaulin Jacket":

A tall stalwart lancer lay dying,
And as on his deathbed he lay,
To his friends who around him were sighing,
These last dying words he did say:

(chorus) Wrap me up in my tarpaulin jacket
And say a poor buffer lies low;
And six stalwart lancers shall carry me
With steps solemn, mournful and slow.

Had I the wings of a little dove,
Far far away would I fly; I'd fly
Straight for the arms of my true love
And there I would lay me and die.

Then get you two little white tombstones
Put them one at my head and my toe, my toe,
And get you a penknife and scratch there:
"Here lies a poor buffer below."

And get you six brandies and sodas,
And set them all out in a row, a row,
And get you six jolly good fellows
To drink to this buffer below.

And then in the calm of the twilight
When the soft winds are whispering low, so low,
And the darkening shadows are falling,
Sometimes think of this buffer below.

== Author ==
Wintle began writing in 1924 after he broke his leg while riding. In a March 1962 interview on the BBC, Wintle stated, "I did not fall off my horse as a dentist might. A horse fell on top of me and broke my leg." Wintle initially wrote fiction under the pen name "Michael Cobb" stating, "For a cavalry officer, to be literate, let alone write, is a disgrace." The Michael Cobb novel The Emancipation of Ambrose (1928) was filmed in 1936 as Wolf's Clothing. Other works, published as A. D. Wintle, include the fictional biography Aesop (1943), the novel Ilium: A Story of Troy (1944), and The Club (1961).

== Biographies ==
A full-length autobiography, compiled after his death by his friend Alastair Revie from more than a million words left by Wintle, was published in 1968 by Michael Joseph as The Last Englishman. In the 1995 BBC TV film The Last Englishman, dramatised by Anthony Horowitz, Wintle was played by Jim Broadbent.

A short biography of Wintle can be found in chapter 13 ("Colonel 'Debag' rides again", pp 143–153) of Robert Littell's It Takes All Kinds published by Reynal & Co, New York, 1961. J. D. Casswell, KC represented Wintle at his Second World War court-martial and devotes pages 152–159 to Wintle in his 1961 autobiography, A Lance For Liberty. A brief biography can be found in the Spring 1989 Victorian Bar News.
