= Boys Town Jerusalem =

School in Jerusalem, Israel

- קרית נוער ירושלים
- Kiryat Noar Yerushalayim

Location
- 20 Harav Frank St. Bayit Vegan; Jerusalem
- Coordinates: 31.7632°N 35.1850°E

Information
- School type: Junior high, high school, yeshiva, technical colleges
- Motto: From limited backgrounds to limitless futures
- Established: 1949
- Founder: Rabbi Alexander Linchner
- Dean: Rabbi Moshe Linchner
- Principal: Rabbi David Twersky, junior high school Rabbi Elimelech Yaakov, high school
- Gender: Male
- Age range: 12–20
- Enrollment: 850 (2012)
- Campus size: 18 acres (7.3 ha)
- Budget: $7.5 million
- Graduates: 6,500
- Website: http://www.boystownjerusalem.org

Boys Town Jerusalem (Hebrew: קרית נוער ירושלים, Kiryat Noar Yerushalayim) is an Orthodox Jewish educational institution in Jerusalem. Founded in 1949, it houses over 850 boys aged 12 to 20 on its 18 acres (7.3 ha) Bayit Vegan campus, and provides on-site religious, secular, and technological education on the junior high through college levels.

It is the largest yeshiva/vocational school in the world and is one of Israel's most important technological training centers. It maintains a close working relationship with the Israel Defense Forces, which partnered in the founding of its on-campus College of Applied Engineering and makes frequent use of that college's facilities and graduates. It also has a publishing division. Boys Town Jerusalem originated the Jan Zwartendijk Award for Humanitarian Ethics and Values, which it awards annually to Holocaust-era rescuers and other proponents of humanitarian values.

== History ==
Boys Town Jerusalem was founded in 1949 by Rabbi Alexander Linchner (1908–1997), a native of Brooklyn, New York, and son-in-law of Rabbi Shraga Feivel Mendlowitz. Linchner sought to establish a home for child Holocaust survivors, war refugees, and impoverished immigrants. He was encouraged by his father-in-law, who urged him from his deathbed in 1948 "to do something for the chinuch (education) of children in Israel". Linchner based his educational model on the Torah im Derech Eretz (Torah study combined with work) approach articulated by Rabbi Samson Raphael Hirsch.

Initial enrollment was 14 Yemenite Jewish children in a refugee camp. In 1953, the school moved into prefab huts in Bayit Vegan. Its current campus opened in 1964. By 1968, enrollment was at 650; by 1985, it had reached 1,000.

From its inception, Boys Town Jerusalem continually expanded its academic, vocational, and recreational facilities. During the second half of the 1950s, vocational schools for printing, precision mechanics, and furniture design were opened, and the first high-school class was graduated. In the 1960s, schools of lithography, electronics, and technical education were established. The 1970s saw the opening of the College of Applied Engineering, a computer center, a recreation center, and junior high school. The 1980s introduced special programs developed for Russian, Iranian, and Ethiopian immigrant students. The 1990s and 2000s saw the addition of a Torah and Technology Academy, an electronics center, an interdisciplinary Holocaust studies program, and a special program for French immigrants.

After Linchner's death in 1997, his son, Rabbi Moshe Linchner, assumed the position of dean, and his grandson, Rabbi Meir Linchner, became rosh yeshiva of the orphanage's yeshiva.

== Student body ==
Boys Town Jerusalem enrolls students from 45 different countries. The staff includes speakers of many languages, including French and Persian. Special cultural programs include:

- Naale Zion program for French students who come to Israel without their parents
- Naale OhrDessa program for Russian immigrant students
- Ethiopian program

Approximately two-thirds of the population are Sephardi Jews. The majority of boys are from economically-deprived families, and receive scholarship assistance. Students are encouraged to live on campus, and are served kosher meals.

All students are required to serve in the Israel Defense Forces, and most become Israeli citizens. Over the course of its history, 61 graduates and three staff members have fallen in the line of duty.

== Academic curriculum ==
Boys Town Jerusalem operates a three-track academic curriculum consisting of Judaic, academic, and technological studies.

=== Judaic studies ===
The on-site yeshiva is called Tiferet Yerushalayim–S. Daniel Abraham Israel Program.

=== Academic studies ===
Students attend grades 7 through 12 on campus, completing the full academic curriculum mandated by the Israel Ministry of Education. The school also schedules daily, 3-hour tutoring groups to prepare high-school seniors for their Bagrut (matriculation) examinations. In 2012 the school received a special commendation from the Israel Ministry of Education for the large number of students passing the Bagrut examinations in 2010 and 2011. The Ministry noted that 73.5% of Boys Town Jerusalem graduates earned full matriculation certificates, compared to a national average of 50% of high-school students.

Boys also engage in community service projects such as camp counseling and assembling home-care equipment.

=== Scientific and technological training ===
Boys Town Jerusalem operates two college-level programs, the Technical Teachers College and the College of Applied Engineering. Students in the latter college have the option to pursue a 2-year or 4-year degree. The College of Applied Engineering was established in 1971 in partnership with the Israel Defense Forces, which makes use of its facilities and graduates. Students receive a 2-year deferment from military service in order to attend the College, and then commit themselves to a minimum 4-year service in the IDF as applied engineers.

In the 2000s, the IDF established several specialized programs at the College of Applied Engineering. The Shachak program trains a select group of electronics students for work on technological support teams in the Israel Air Force. The Marom program trains English and mathematics students to be officers in the Israel Ordnance Corps.

Courses at the College of Applied Engineering include electronics, computer science, precision mathematics, and computer-aided design and manufacturing. In 2013 a robotics laboratory was installed. This laboratory will also provide training for electronics specialists for the Israel Air Force and Ordnance Corps.

Among the products developed by Boys Town Jerusalem engineering students are a hand-held orientation device for the blind and a security system for Israeli settlements.

=== Other programs ===
In 2011, an animal therapy pilot was initiated by request of the Israel Ministry of Education. This project has expanded to accommodate students with emotional issues. The orphanage also offers art therapy, music therapy, psychodrama, and psychotherapy.

== Faculty ==
- Rabbi Moshe Linchner, Dean
- Rabbi Meir Linchner, Rosh Yeshiva

Rabbi Yonatan Sandler, victim of the 2012 Toulouse and Montauban shootings, taught a ninth-grade class in the French program before his move to France.

== Campus ==
Located in the Bayit Vegan neighborhood of Jerusalem, the 18-acre Boys Town Jerusalem campus includes 64 classrooms and laboratories, a computer center, 8 synagogues, and 60 parks.

In 2011 the school installed rooftop solar panels that generate a total of 40 kilowatts of electricity per hour. The electricity is sold to the Israel Electric Corporation in return for a reduced electricity bill, saving the school 22% of its monthly electricity charges.

== Funding ==
The Israeli government covers less than half of the institution's annual budget of $10.7 million, with the rest being covered by donations. Boys Town Jerusalem Foundation of America is located in New York City. Other fund-raising branches are located in North Miami Beach, Florida, Wynnewood, Pennsylvania, Baltimore, Toronto, and London.

== Boys Town Jerusalem Publishers ==
With the establishment of the school of lithography in 1962, Boys Town Jerusalem opened a publishing division. It produced several translations in its Jewish Classics Series, including Maimonides' Mishneh Torah (The Book of Adoration and The Book of Knowledge), Chovot HaLevavot (Duties of the Heart) by Bahya ibn Paquda a Passover Haggadah, and various reference works.

== Jan Zwartendijk Memorial Award ==
In 1996, Boys Town Jerusalem inaugurated the Jan Zwartendijk Award for Humanitarian Ethics and Values, named for a non-Jewish Dutch businessman who rescued more than 2,000 Jews during the Holocaust. In the 2000s this award was bestowed on other Holocaust-era rescuers such as Giovanni Palatucci, President Manuel Luis Quezon and the people of the Philippines, and Ho Feng-Shan. Other recipients of the award include Christoph Meili and Rabbi Arthur Schneier. A memorial garden was established on campus, with the names of annual winners engraved on large marble markers.
