= Helena Kuipers-Rietberg =

Dutch resistance fighter (1893–1944)

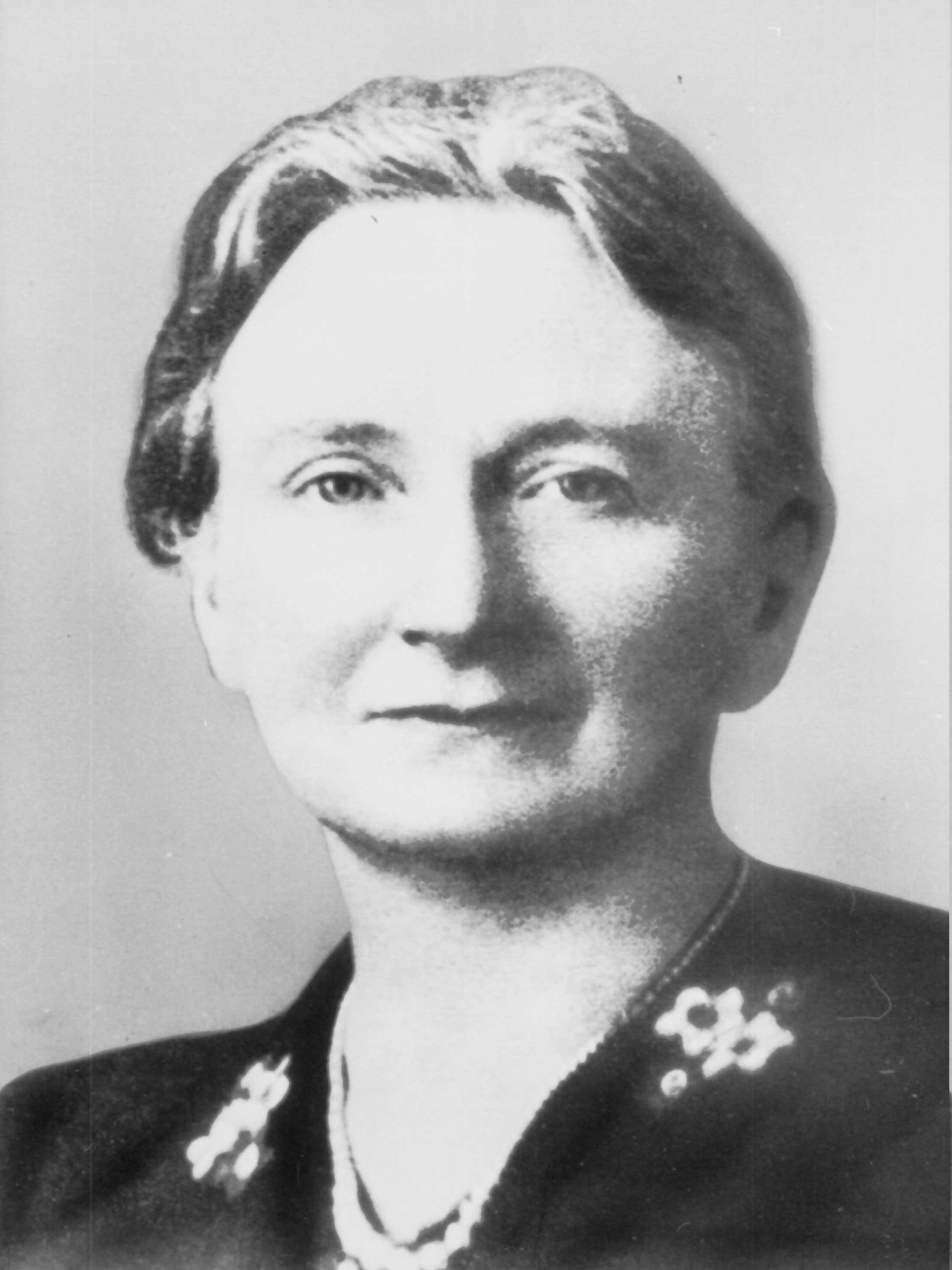
- Helena Kuipers-Rietberg
- Born: Helena Theodora Rietberg; 26 May 1893; Winterswijk, Netherlands
- Died: 27 December 1944 (aged 51); Ravensbrück
- Other names: Tante Riek
- Known for: Resistance fighter during World War II

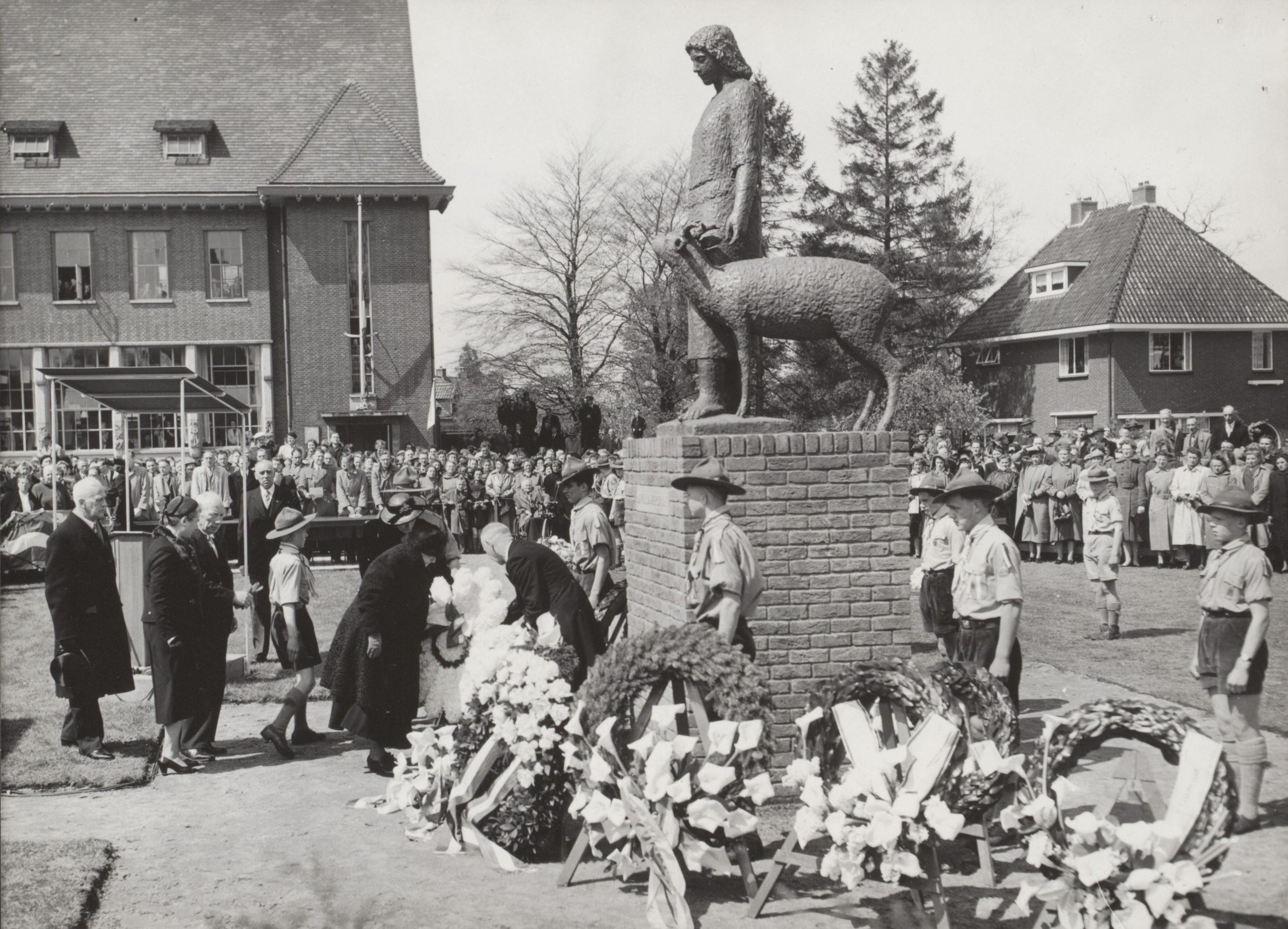
Princess Wilhelmina on 4 May 1955, at the monument for Kuipers-Rietberg in Winterswijk. Statue by Gerrit Bolhuis.

Helena Theodora Kuipers-Rietberg (26 May 1893 – 27 December 1944) was a Dutch resistance member who played an important role during World War II, when she was one of the driving forces of a national underground organization that supported those who were hiding from the German occupying forces. She was known as "Tante Riek", or "Aunt Riek".

== Early life ==
Helena Kuipers was born on 26 May 1893 to grain merchants and millers Hendrik Rietberg and Clara Christina Theodora Dulfer in Winterswijk, as the fourth child in a Dutch Reformed family. She attended the Hogere burgerschool where she met her future husband, Piet Kuipers (1892–1978), also a merchant in grain. After graduation she worked in her father's office, and her husband bought into the company. They had two sons and three daughters. Kuipers was also active in local organizations, and in 1932 co-founded the Gereformeerde Vrouwenbeweging, an organization of Dutch Reformed women, and starting in 1937 she was on the board of the newly founded Bond van Gereformeerde Vrouwenvereenigingen in Nederland, an organization which united all Dutch Reformed women's organizations in the country. This allowed her to build a national network, which would benefit her later during the German occupation.

== Resistance ==
Kuipers-Rietberg, who lived near the German border, realized early in the 1930s what the rise to power of Hitler meant. Soon after the German occupation of the Netherlands her family joined the Dutch resistance. She started on a small scale, taking in Jewish onderduikers (people who had to go underground to avoid arrest and persecution). Her husband went into the countryside to aid onderduikers and escaped prisoners of war. After the start of large-scale allied bombings of Germany, in March 1943, this also included members of Allied bombing squads shot down over the Achterhoek, who had to be hidden and then moved back to England. Funds for all these activities came from one of a number of illegal sources, which later were united as the Nationaal Steun Fonds, for which she became the paymaster for her area, the Achterhoek. Her code name was "Tante Riek", or "Aunt Riek".

In November 1942 Kuipers-Rietberg came in contact with Dutch Reformed minister Frits Slomp, described as a "charismatic" man, whose help she sought to open up homes of Reformed people all over the country. With his help she set up a national network of local help organizations (organizational meetings were supposedly Bible study groups), the foundation for the Landelijke Organisatie voor Hulp aan Onderduikers (LO), and the Landelijke Knokploegen (LKP), allied to it after August 1943. Many of the men the organization helped were called up for forced labor, the Arbeitseinsatz; of the 350,000 people that had to go into hiding during the war, the LO helped two thirds.

On 24 May 1944 a police officer warned Kuipers-Rietberg's husband of an impending arrest. In early July, they narrowly escaped capture, evading the Sicherheitsdienst. The couple hid in Bennekom, with a tobacco manufacturer, but the tension proved too much for their benefactors and they left. On 17 August 1944 the courier bringing them fresh identification papers was betrayed and arrested, and the Germans found evidence of their hideout. They were betrayed by double agent Miep Oranje and arrested two days later.

== Imprisonment and death ==
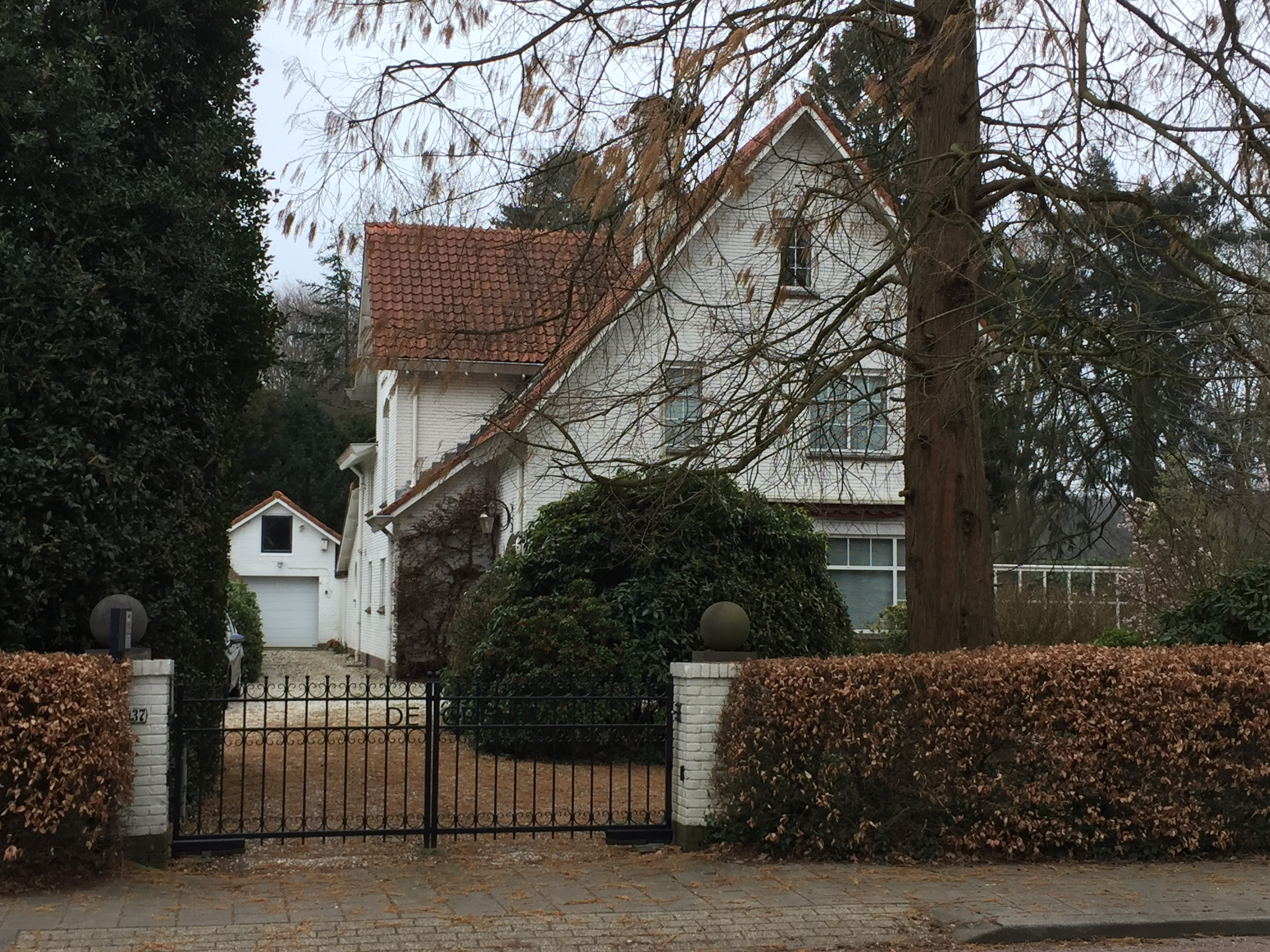
De Bovenweg 37 in Bennekom, where Kuipers-Rietberg was arrested on 19 August 1944

The couple was jailed in the Koepelgevangenis in Arnhem and agreed that she would take full responsibility; they thought a woman would be punished less than a man. Her husband was released. He went into hiding, and she was transported to Kamp Vught on 25 August 1944. Vught was emptied out soon, after Allied advances in the Netherlands and the rumors related to Dolle Dinsdag, and Kuipers-Rietberg was transported to Ravensbrück concentration camp on 7 September 1944, on one of the last transports. She was not qualified for forced labor in the factory and was instead put to work knitting. She was also placed in charge of distributing food to the women who worked in the war industry, at the Siemens factory at Ravensbrück, and was thus able to provide comfort to her fellow prisoners. She helped care for her resistance friend Minnie Jolink (one of the Dames Jolink) during her final hours and held a remembrance for her and later for Betsie ten Boom. She fell ill at the end of October and died on 27 December 1944, possibly from typhoid or a respiratory infection.

== Children ==
In July 1944, when Kuipers-Rietberg and her husband escaped, the children came home from school to find their parents gone. A neighbor took them in. Heleen Stevenson-Kuipers, the youngest child, related the events that followed in a 2020 interview with Tubantia. The day after, she was taken to a nursing home, where friends of her mother worked. She remembered getting a letter from a friend, who wrote that NSB members had occupied their home and were playing with her dolls. With her brother Eddy she lived in Bussum, with her father's brother, and then with another family. After the war, it took a while to discover what had happened to their mother, but they did receive letters from women who had survived Ravensbrück and told them how much Kuipers-Rietberg had comforted and supported them. When Princess Wilhelmina of the Netherlands came to Winterswijk in 1955 for the unveiling of the monument for Kuipers-Rietberg in 1955, she told Heleen, "you must be proud of your mother", to which she only responded, "I wish she were still here". Pride only came later, she said. Her father remarried to a woman who also had suffered trauma during the war, and three more children were born from that marriage.

== Legacy ==
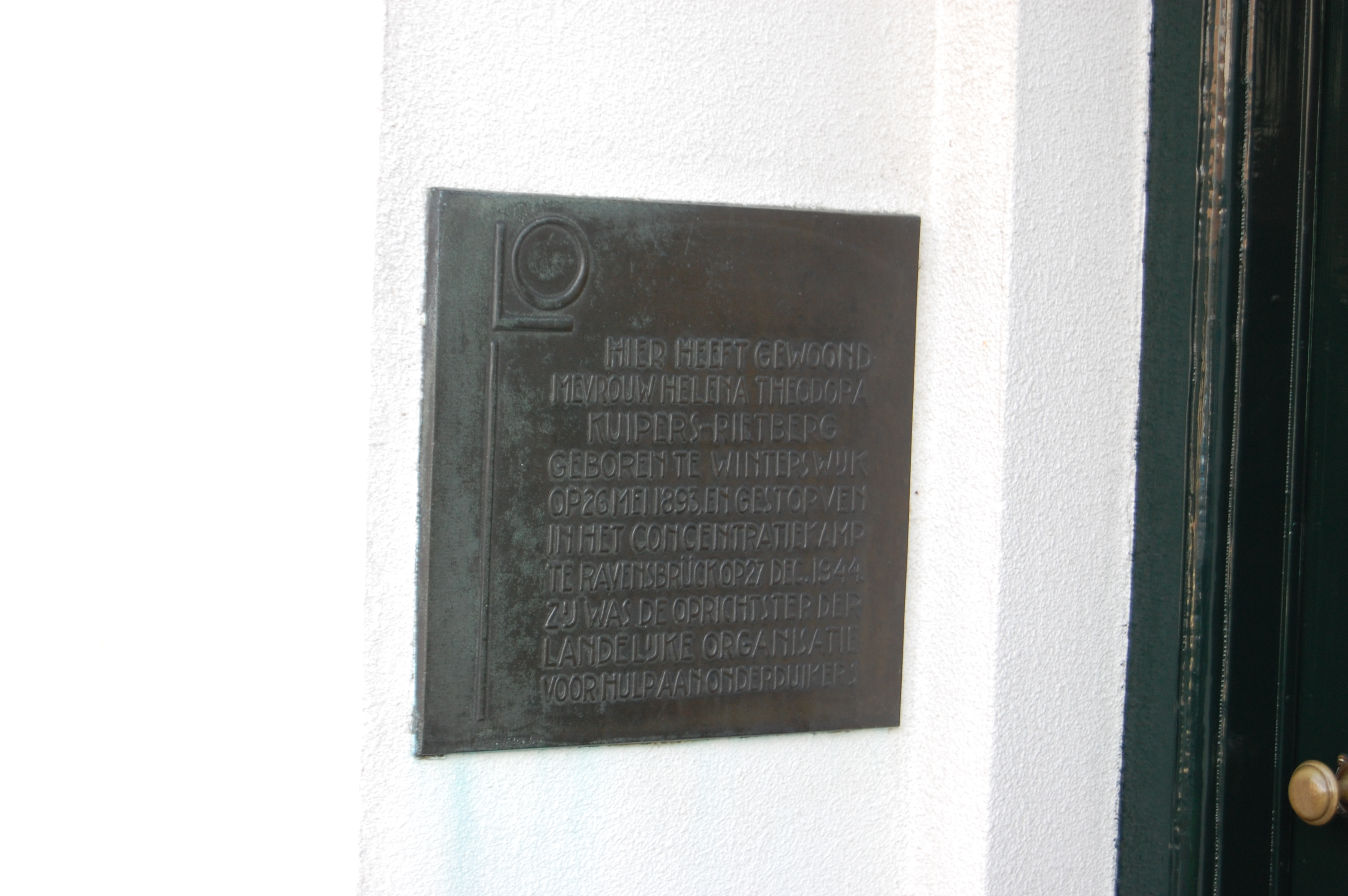
Plaquette Tante Riek in Winterswijk

Tante Riek is remembered in various places. On 4 May 1955, in Winterswijk, a monument in her honor was revealed by Princess Wilhelmina. The statue, on the square named for her, depicts a young woman who protects a young deer, symbol of those who were persecuted during the war. Nearby, at her old house, in the Willinkstraat, a plaque remembers her. A framed portrait of Kuipers-Rietberg is on the late Queen Wilhelmina's desk in Het Loo Palace. A street in Gouda is named for her.

In 2017 she was featured in an episode of the TV show Het was oorlog, aired by Omroep MAX.
