= Edward Eveleigh =

British lawyer and army officer (1917–2014)

Sir Edward Walter Eveleigh, ERD (8 October 1917 – 24 September 2014) was a British barrister, judge and British Army officer. He presided over a number of high-profile cases including that of the serial killer Graham Young and the former MP John Stonehouse. He went on to serve as a Lord Justice of Appeal from 1977 to 1985.

== Early life ==
Eveleigh was born on 8 October 1917 in Eastleigh, Hampshire. His father was a railway clerk. He was educated at Peter Symonds Grammar School, an all-boys grammar school in Winchester. While at school, he held the record for the 100-yard dash. He was a member of his school's Officer Training Corps, the forerunner to the Combined Cadet Force.

He studied law at Brasenose College, Oxford University. Following a break in his studies when he was called up at the start of WW2, he graduated in 1940 with a Bachelor of Arts (BA) degree. This was later promoted to Master of Arts (MA Oxon), as per tradition.

== Career ==
=== Military service ===
Eveleigh was commissioned into the reserve of the Royal Regiment of Artillery on 29 August 1936 as a second lieutenant. He was called up at the start of World War II and served for six weeks during the Phoney War before returning to his university studies.

=== Legal career ===
He took silk in 1961, having been appointed a Queen's Counsel (QC) on 10 April of that year.

On 25 April 1961, he was appointed a Recorder, a part-time judge, sitting at the magistrates' court of Burton-upon-Trent.

== Arms ==
Coat of arms of Edward Eveleigh

Motto
Facias Ipse
