= Mayor's and City of London Court =

Coordinates: 51.5153°N 0.0915°W

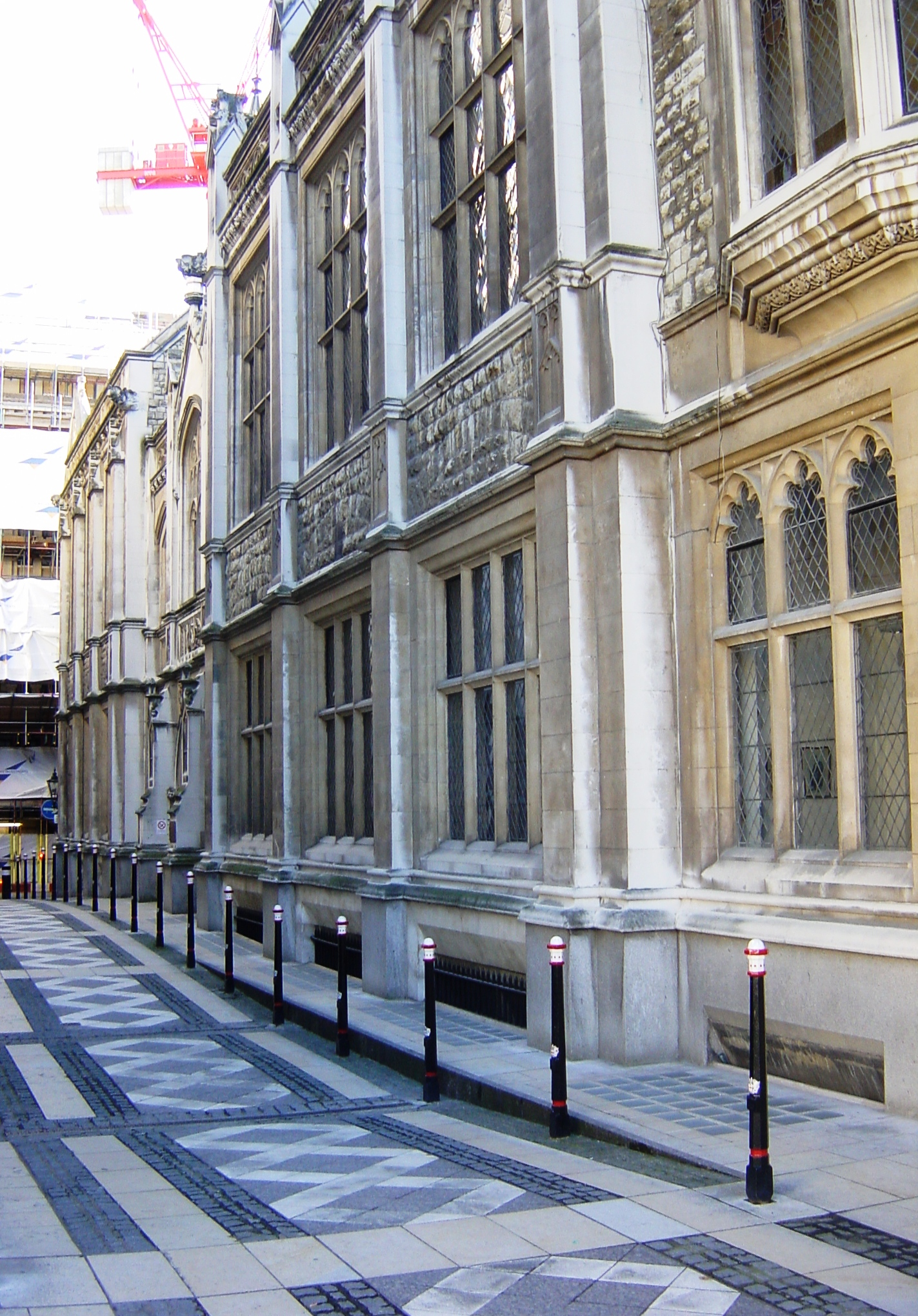
The court

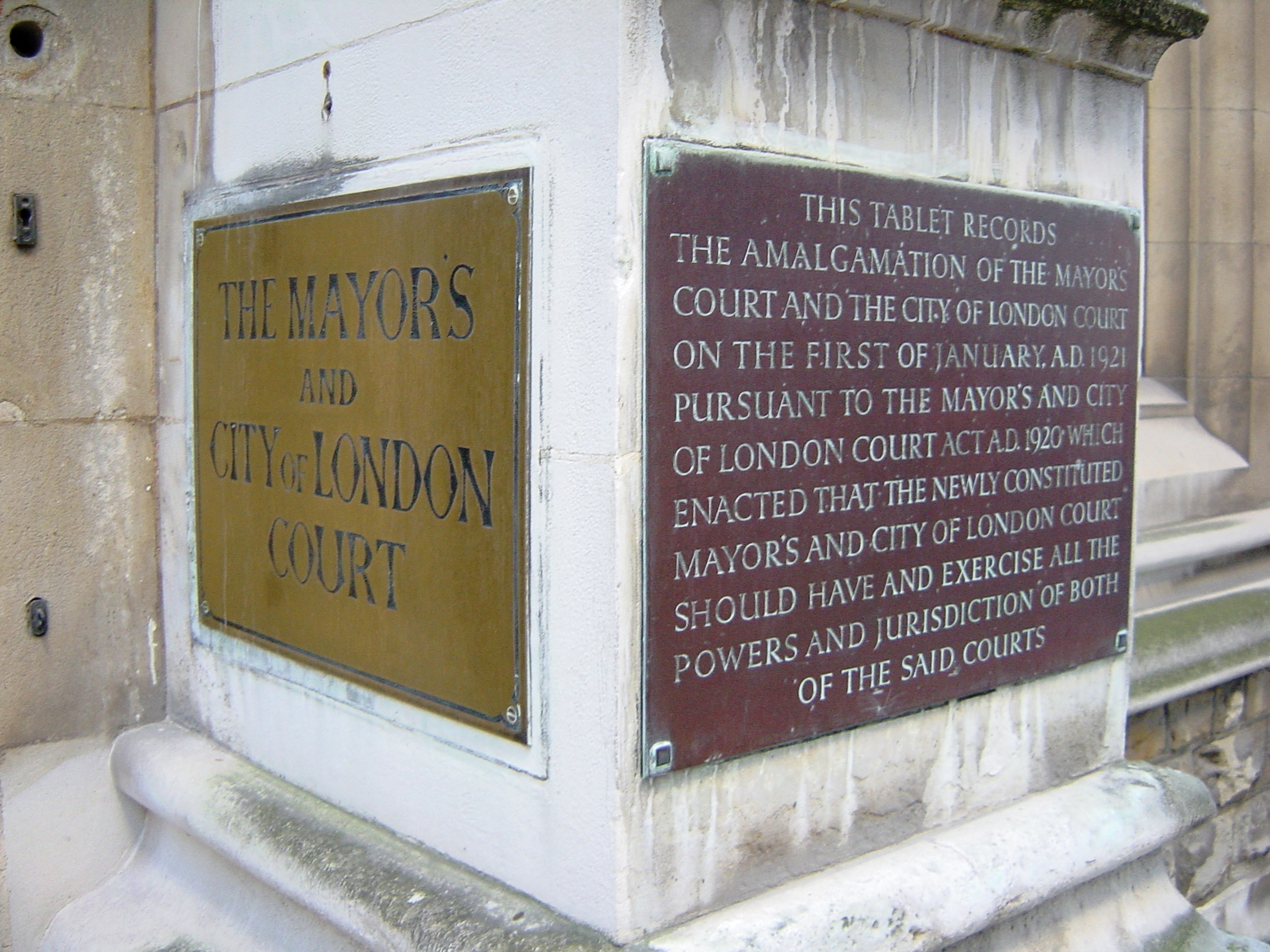
A tablet by the entrance records the creation of the court in 1921

The Mayor's and City of London Court is a sitting of the County Court in the City of London. It is located at Guildhall Buildings, Basinghall Street.

== History ==
The current court is the successor to courts pre-dating the County Courts Act 1846 (9 & 10 Vict. c. 95), which introduced the modern system of county courts. The 1846 act deliberately did not extend to the City of London, where the previously constituted courts continued to exercise jurisdiction:

Courts in the City of London
| Name | | Jurisdiction |
|---|---|---|
| City of London Court | Known as the "Sheriff's Court" until 1852, before becoming the "City of London Small Debts Court". Under the County Courts Act 1867, it became known as the "City of London Court". | Until the passage of the Local Government Act 1888, its judge was elected by the Corporation of the City of London. It had all the jurisdiction of a county court, but persons who merely had employment in the City were also subject to its jurisdiction. It had exclusive jurisdiction over cases of replevin. |
| Mayor's Court | A court of great antiquity, having the status of an inferior court of record. | Unlimited jurisdiction in contract, tort and ejectment, where the whole cause of action arose in the City; and jurisdiction up to £50 where part of the cause of action arose in the City, or where the defendant dwelt or carried on business there either then or within the previous six months. |

The Palace Court also exercised jurisdiction within the City in certain cases until its abolition in 1849.

Mayor's and City of London Court Act 1920 (Note: Section 12(3).)
- Act of Parliament
- Parliament of the United Kingdom
- Long title: An Act to amalgamate the City of London Court with the Mayor's Court of London and for purposes in connection therewith.
- Citation: 10 & 11 Geo. 5. c. cxxxiv
- Territorial extent: London

Dates
- Royal assent: 16 August 1920
- Commencement: 1 January 1921 (Note: Section 12(1).)
- Repealed: 25 March 1964
Other legislation
| Amended by | County Courts Act 1934 |
| Repealed by | City of London (Courts) Act 1964 |

Status: Repealed

Text of statute as originally enacted

The two courts were combined with effect from 1 January 1921 by the Mayor's and City of London Court Act 1920 (10 & 11 Geo. 5. c. cxxxiv). High Court procedure was declared to apply to matters formerly dealt with by the Mayor's Court, while county court procedure applied to matters falling under the City of London Court.

== 1971 reform ==
Under section 42 of the Courts Act 1971, the old Mayor's and City of London Court was abolished, the City of London was made a county court district, and the new county court for the city of London was given the name of its predecessor. It was the only county court not to contain "county" in its title. The individual county courts have since been replaced by a single County Court for England and Wales.

== See also ==
- List of County Court venues in England and Wales
