= List of British Jewish writers =

List of British Jewish writers includes writers (novelists, poets, playwrights, journalists, authors of scholarly texts and others) from the United Kingdom and its predecessor states who are or were Jewish or of Jewish descent.

== Authors, A–J ==
- Ben Aaronovitch (born 22 February 1964) author and screenwriter; author of the Rivers of London series of novels; also wrote two Doctor Who serials in the late 1980s and spin-off novels from Doctor Who and Blake's 7; brother of neo-conservative hawkish journalist David Aaronovitch; son of economist Sam Aaronovitch who was senior member of the Communist Party of Great Britain, and younger brother of Coronation Street actor Owen Aaronovitch.
- Tobias Abse historian, author focusing on Jewish history, fascism, Marxism, socialism; lecturer at Goldsmiths College of the University of London; has written extensively on rise of the Fascist Right in Italy prior to World War II; member of Socialist Alliance National Executive, the Alliance for Green Socialism National Committee, the Socialist History Society committee and the Revolutionary History editorial board and is regular contributor to socialist newspapers and magazines such as Radical Philosophy, The Weekly Worker, the paper of the Communist Party of Great Britain, Marxists Internet Archive; son of the Labour MP and social reformer Leo Abse (1917–2008); of Polish Jewish ancestry.
- Gerhard Adler (14 April 1904 – 23 December 1988) of German Jewish ancestry, was a major figure in the world of analytical psychology who had a significant effect on popular culture in England; known for his translation into English from the original German and editorial work on the Collected Works of Carl Gustav Jung.
- Grace Aguilar (2 June 1816 – 16 September 1847) was an English novelist, poet and writer on Jewish history and religion. Although she had been writing since childhood, much of her work was published posthumously. Among those are her best known works, the novels Home Influence and A Mother's Recompense.
- Geoffrey Alderman (born 10 February 1944) historian that specialises in 19th and 20th centuries Jewish community in England; also a political adviser and journalist; although he is a Conservative Zionist supporter of Israel with controversial views on Palestinians, Alderman has made guest appearances on Iran's PressTV channel. In 2011, he made four such appearances and donated his appearance fees of £300 to Israel. Of Alderman's dozen or so books, the best-known is Modern British Jewry (second edition, 1998, OUP). He has also written for the New Dictionary of National Biography, with special responsibility for post-1800 Jewish entries, and for The Guardian and The Jewish Chronicle. He is a columnist for the Jewish Telegraph.
- Naomi Alderman novelist, winner of the 2006 Orange Award for New Writers; daughter of Geoffrey Alderman
- Rose Allatini novelist. (Also wrote under the names A.T. Fitzroy, Lucian Wainwright and Eunice Buckley.)
- Simon Amstell (born 29 November 1979), comedian, scriptwriter, screenwriter for television and radio and director : wrote and directed the films Carnage (2017) and Benjamin (2018). His work on television has included presenting Popworld and Never Mind the Buzzcocks; co-wrote episode of Channel 4 teenage drama Skins.
- Mick Anglo (born Maurice Anglowitz, 19 June 1916 – 31 October 2011) of Russian Jewish ancestry, was a British comic book writer, editor and artist, as well as an author. He is best known for creating the superhero Marvelman, later known as Miracleman, a character later revived in 1982 in a dark, post-modern reboot by writer Alan Moore, with later contributions by Neil Gaiman.
- Lisa Appignanesi (born 4 January 1946) writer, novelist, campaigner for free expression; was Chair of the Royal Society of Literature; former President of English PEN; Chair of Freud Museum; chaired 2017 Booker International Prize; Honorary Fellow of St Benet's Hall, Oxford and visiting professor in the Department of English at King's College London, and held a Wellcome Trust; has written for The New York Review of Books, The Guardian and The Observer, as well as making programmes and appearing on the BBC; was Director of Talks and Seminars at the Institute of Contemporary Arts (ICA) in London; was made a Chevalier of the Ordre des Arts et des Lettres and was appointed Officer of the Most Excellent Order of the British Empire (OBE) in the 2013 New Year Honours for services to literature. She became a Fellow of the Royal Society of Literature in 2015 and became the Chair of the Royal Society of Literature Council in 2016.
- Neal Ascherson (born 5 October 1932) journalist and writer; described by Radio Prague as "one of Britain's leading experts on central and eastern Europe". Ascherson is the author of several books on the history of Poland and Ukraine; work has appeared in The Guardian ; contributed scripts for the documentary series The World at War (1973–74) and the Cold War (1998). He has also been a regular contributor to the London Review of Books.
- Gilad Atzmon, Israeli-British Holocaust denier, agent provocateur, author, writer, prolific blogger, saxophonist for the Blockheads and Pink Floyd; bebop jazz musician of Israeli birth and Ashkenazi origin.
- David Baddiel (born 28 May 1964) comedian, op-ed writer, broadcaster and author of over ten books, including Jews Don't Count, which is about antisemitism, under-representation in popular media, double standards against, exclusion of, and ethnic or racial prejudice against Jews in Britain.
- Ivor Baddiel, brother of David Baddiel scriptwriter and author. He regularly writes for some of the biggest shows on British television including The BAFTAs (British Academy Film Awards), The X Factor and The National Television Awards. Ivor is also the author of nineteen books for both children and adults.
- Sir Michael Balcon (19 May 1896 – 17 October 1977) prolific author and film producer known for leadership of Ealing Studios, one of the most important British film studios; known for his leadership, and his guidance of Alfred Hitchcock;co-founded Gainsborough Pictures, later working with Gaumont British and MGM-British; chairman of the British Film Institute; grandfather of Daniel Day-Lewis.
- Michael Balint (Hungarian: Bálint Mihály; 3 December 1896 – 31 December 1970) Hungarian Jewish psychoanalyst convert to Christianity who spent most of his adult life in England. He was a proponent of the Object Relations school and author of numerous academic texts and monographs on psychiatry; was attached to the Tavistock Clinic; in 1968 Balint became president of the British Psychoanalytical Society; his wife was noted psychoanalyst and author, Enid Balint, who directed British Psychoanalytical Society (now Institute of Psychoanalysis). A volume of her papers, Before I was I: Psychoanalysis and the Imagination, was published in 1993.
- Simon Baron-Cohen (b.1958); clinical psychologist ; professor of developmental psychopathology at University of Cambridge; director of the university's Autism Research Centre and a Fellow of Trinity College; was knighted for services to people with autism; was awarded the Medical Research Council (MRC) Millennium Medal; He is the 2026 recipient of the Grawemeyer Award in Psychology. brother of Sacha Baron Cohen
- Zygmunt Bauman (19 November 1925 – 9 January 2017) highly influential Polish Jewish writer, sociologist and philosopher, writing on postmodern consumerism and liquid modernity.
- Peter Benenson (born Peter James Henry Solomon; 31 July 1921 – 25 February 2005) British lawyer, writer, pamphleteer, human rights activist and the founder of human rights group Amnesty International (AI); accepted the Pride of Britain Award for Lifetime Achievement in 2001 though he later rejected and denounced Amnesty International for its criticism of Israel. Benenson was the son of British-born Harold Solomon and Russian-born Flora Benenson, grandson of Russian financier Grigori Benenson (1860–1939); served in Intelligence Corps at the Ministry of Information and worked at Bletchley Park during World War II as a cryptographer.
- Leila Berg (12 November 1917 – 17 April 2012) was an English children's author, editor and play specialist. She was well known as a journalist and a writer on education and children's rights. Berg was a recipient of the Eleanor Farjeon Award.
- John Berger, Jewish father, convert to Roman Catholicism, (5 November 1926 – 2 January 2017) English art critic, novelist, painter and poet. Berger's essay on art criticism Ways of Seeing, is known as a foundation text employing deconstruction and feminist prisms of epistemology and ontology, questioning axiomatic assumptions about gender, racial prejudice and Orientalism, whilst introducing and debating prisms of Psychological projection, Reification (Marxism), False Consciousness, Commodity fetishism, Marx's theory of alienation and essentialism. He was a supporter of the Palestinian cause, and, focused on Israel and apartheid, a member of the Support Committee of the Russell Tribunal on Palestine.
- Joseph Berke M.D. (17 January 1939 – 11 January 2021) was an American–born psychotherapist, author of over ten books and lecturer; studied at Columbia College of Columbia University and Albert Einstein College of Medicine; moved to London where he worked with R. D. Laing when Philadelphia Association was being established; was resident at Kingsley Hall; later became an artist and writer; collaborated on a number of projects with Laing, including the Dialectics of Liberation international conference in London; co-founder of the Arbours Association in London and founder and director of Arbours Crisis Centre (1973–2010) in London. He was the author of many articles and books on psychological, social, and religious themes.
- J. D. Bernal (10 May 1901 – 15 September 1971) was an Irish scientist of Sephardi ancestry who pioneered the use of X-ray crystallography in molecular biology, published on the history of science, wrote popular books on science and society; was a communist activist and a member of the Communist Party of Great Britain (CPGB); his book The World, the Flesh and the Devil called "the most brilliant attempt at scientific prediction ever made" by Arthur C. Clarke. It is famous for having been the first to propose the so-called Bernal sphere, a type of space habitat intended for permanent residence. The second chapter explores radical changes to human bodies and intelligence and the third discusses the impact of these on society.
- Martin Bernal author and leading pioneer in the creation of Pan-African studies, of Sephardi ancestry, most famous for his work Black Athena.
- Drusilla Beyfus (1927–2026) was a British etiquette writer. She was married to the journalist and critic Milton Shulman.
- Julie Bindel (born 20 July 1962) English radical feminist writer of Roman Catholic and Jewish ancestry.
- Lajos Bíró, 22 August 1880 – 9 September 1948, was a Hungarian Jewish author, novelist, playwright, and screenwriter who wrote many films from the early 1920s through the late 1940s.
- Jeremy Black (historian) MBE (born 1955) historian, writer; author of "The Holocaust: History and Memory"; senior fellow at the Center for the Study of America and the West at the Foreign Policy Research Institute in Philadelphia, Pennsylvania; author of over 180 books, principally on British politics and international relations; has been described as "the most prolific historical scholar of our age"; He has published on military and political history, including Warfare in the Western World, 1882–1975 (2001) and The World in the Twentieth Century (2002); editor of Archives, journal of the British Records Association, from 1989 to 2005. has served on the Council of the British Records Association (1989–2005); the Council of the Royal Historical Society (1993–1996 and 1997–2000); and the Council of the List and Index Society (from 1997); has sat on the editorial boards of History Today, International History Review, Journal of Military History, Media History and the Journal of the Royal United Service Institution (now the RUSI Journal); awarded Samuel Eliot Morison Prize for lifetime achievement by the Society for Military History.
- Anthony Blond (20 March 1928 – 27 February 2008) publisher and author involved with several publishing companies over his career; of Sephardi ancestry; cousin of Harold Laski.
- Heston Blumenthal celebrity chef and author of over five books, was born in Shepherd's Bush, London, on 27 May 1966, to a Jewish father born in Southern Rhodesia and an English mother who converted to Judaism. His surname comes from a great-grandfather from Latvia and means 'flowered valley' (or 'bloom-dale'), in German.
- Vernon Bogdanor (born 16 July 1943); author, academic, scholar, political scientist, historian, and research professor at the Institute for Contemporary British History at King's College London; emeritus professor of politics and government at the University of Oxford and an emeritus fellow of Brasenose College, Oxford; appointed Commander of the Order of the British Empire (CBE) in the 1998 Birthday Honours for services to constitutional history; appointed a Chevalier de la Légion d'honneur by president of France, Nicolas Sarkozy; was knighted in 2023 New Year Honours for services to political science.
- David Bohm (20 December 1917 – 27 October 1992) American British scientist and prolific author described as one of the most significant theoretical physicists of the 20th century, who contributed unorthodox ideas to quantum theory, neuropsychology and the philosophy of mind, of Hungarian Jewish origin.
- Alain de Botton popular author, broadcaster and YouTube channel entrepreneur, of Ashkenazi and Sephardic ancestry. He co-founded The School of Life. Botton is the son of Gilbert de Botton and descended from a distinguished Sephardic Jewish family; among his ancestors were the rabbinical scholar Abraham de Boton and Yolande Harmer journalist and Israeli intelligence officer. He is also related to Leonard Wolfson, Baron Wolfson, Miel de Botton and Janet Wolfson de Botton, Trustee of Tate and Chairman of the Council of Tate Modern and appointed Commander of the Most Excellent Order of the British Empire (CBE) in 2006 and elevated to Dame Commander of the Order of the British Empire (DBE) in the 2013 Birthday Honours for charitable services to the arts.
- Caryl Brahms writer
- Julius Braunthal (1891–1972) was an Austrian Jewish historian, magazine editor, and political activist; Secretary of the Socialist International from 1951 to 1956; wrote three volume History of the International, first published in German between 1961 and 1971.
- David Bret biographer, broadcaster and chansonnier (French-born; Jewish father)
- Jacob Bronowski (18 January 1908 – 22 August 1974) Polish-British mathematician, philosopher, academic and author of more than eighteen scholarly books, focusing on William Blake, magic and evolution; is best known for developing a humanistic approach to science, and as the presenter and writer of the 1973 BBC television documentary series, and accompanying book The Ascent of Man, which led to his regard as "one of the world's most celebrated intellectuals".
- Anita Brookner (16 July 1928 – 10 March 2016) of Polish Jewish ancestry, novelist and art historian; Slade Professor of Fine Art at the University of Cambridge from 1967 to 1968; first woman to hold this visiting professorship; awarded Booker–McConnell Prize for her novel Hotel du Lac.
- Sam Bourne novelist pseudonym of Jonathan Freedland.
- Bill Browder (born 23 April 1964) of Russian Jewish ancestry; author, financier and political activist; CEO and co-founder of Hermitage Capital Management, investment advisor to the Hermitage Fund, which was the largest foreign portfolio investor in Russia; published Red Notice: A True Story of High Finance, Murder, and One Man's Fight for Justice, focusing on his years spent in Russia. A film adaptation written by William Nicholson was reportedly in the works in 2015. A new book by Browder was published on 12 April 2022: Freezing Order: A True Story of Money Laundering, Murder and Surviving Vladimir Putins Wrath.
- Rivkah Brown; editor of Vashti Media and Novara Media; critic of the concept of the New antisemitism, critic of Israel and Zionism, writes for The Guardian, The Independent, the London Review of Books, The Financial Times and New Statesman. Novara Media (often shortened to Novara) is an independent, left-wing alternative media organisation based in the United Kingdom.
- Peter Burke (born 1937) historian, professor and author of over twenty scholarly academic texts and monographs on European history, epistemology, ontology, prisms and perspectives on historiography and ideology; born to Roman Catholic father and Jewish mother (who later converted to Roman Catholicism); was member of School of European Studies at University of Sussex, before moving to University of Cambridge, where he holds title of Professor Emeritus of Cultural History and Fellow of Emmanuel College, Cambridge; celebrated as historian not only of early modern era, but one who emphasises relevance of social and cultural history to modern issues; in 1998, was awarded the Erasmus Medal of the European Academy, and is an honorary doctorate from the Universities of Lund, Copenhagen and Bucharest.
- Elias Canetti novelist, man of letters, 1981 Nobel Prize (Bulgarian-born); most famous for his work on mass psychology of crowds and anti-fascism, Crowds and Power
- David Cesarani (13 November 1956 – 25 October 2015) British historian who specialised in Jewish history, especially the Holocaust. He also wrote several biographies, including Arthur Koestler: The Homeless Mind (1998).
- Tony Cliff (born Yigael Glückstein, Hebrew: יגאל גליקשטיין; 20 May 1917 – 9 April 2000); Trotskyist anti-Zionist; prolific author of over twenty books, scholarly monographs and papers, pamphleteer and radical leftist activist, born in Ottoman Palestine; moved to Britain in 1947; assumed pen name 'Tony Cliff'; founding member and leader of Socialist Review Group, which became the International Socialists and then the Socialist Workers Party.
- Chapman Cohen writer on secularism
- Jackie Collins OBE (4 October 1937 – 19 September 2015) was an English romance novelist and actress. She wrote 32 novels, all of which appeared on The New York Times Best Seller list.
- Alan Coren (27 June 1938 – 18 October 2007) was an English humourist, writer and satirist who was a regular panellist on the BBC radio quiz The News Quiz and a team captain on BBC television's Call My Bluff. Coren, the author of over twenty books, was also a journalist, and for almost a decade was the editor of Punch magazine. His children, Giles and Victoria, are also writers
- Edwina Currie (née Cohen; born 13 October 1946) writer of six novels, broadcaster and former politician and media personality; from 1998 to 2003, hosted late evening talk show on BBC Radio 5 Live, Late Night Currie; moved to HTV, presenting Currie Night; has appeared in string of reality television programmes.
- Charlotte Dacre (1771 or 1772 – 7 November 1825) English author of Gothic novels; wrote under the pseudonym "Rosa Matilda" to confuse her critics; her work was admired by some of the literary giants of her day and her novels influenced Percy Bysshe Shelley, who thought highly of her style and creative skills.
- Ellen Dahrendorf, Baroness Dahrendorf (née Ellen Joan Krug), author, historian, translator of Russian political works; former wife (1980–2004) of the late German/British academic and politician Ralf Dahrendorf; has served on the boards of Article 19, the Jewish Institute for Policy Research; has been chair of British branch of the New Israel Fund; was co-founder of the Working Group on the Internment of Dissidents in Psychiatric Hospitals; is a signatory of the Independent Jewish Voices declaration, which is critical of Israeli policies towards the Palestinians.
- Aviva Dautch (born 5 May 1978) poet, academic, curator and magazine publisher, of Eastern European ancestry; writer in residence at the British Museum, the Jewish Museum London and the Separated Child Foundation and is resident expert on BBC Radio 4's poetry series On Form; English co-translator for Afghan refugee poet and BBC World Service journalist Suhrab Sirat; has written articles, and curated exhibitions and events for arts organisations including the Bethlem Museum of the Mind, The British Library, The Royal Academy of Arts and Tara Arts;lectures internationally on Jewish arts and culture. In 2020 she was appointed executive director of Jewish Renaissance magazine. Dautch also teaches Jewish Culture and Holocaust Studies at the University of Roehampton and lectures at the London School of Jewish Studies and JW3.
- Lionel Davidson (Hull 1922–2009) thriller novelist, Golden Dagger winner, famous for "The night of Wenceslas", "Chelsea murders", "Kolinsky Heights". Lived briefly in Jaffa, Israel at the invitation of the government.
- Isaac Deutscher (Polish: Izaak Deutscher; 3 April 1907 – 19 August 1967); Polish Jewish Marxist author, journalist and political activist who moved to the United Kingdom before the outbreak of World War II; best known as a biographer of Leon Trotsky and as a commentator on Marxist dialectic and Soviet affairs. His three-volume biography of Trotsky was highly influential among the British New Left in the 1960s and 1970s.
- Michael Dickson (educator) (born 11 October 1977) dual citizen British-Israeli; author of ISRESILIENCE: What Israelis Can Teach the World; journalist for The Jerusalem Post, Times of Israel, Jewish Chronicle; executive director of StandWithUs Israel in Jerusalem; senior Fellow at Center for International Communication (CIC) of Bar Ilan University; Honorary member of Alpha Epsilon Pi; winner of the Bonei Zion Prize.
- Jenny Diski (8 July 1947 – 28 April 2016) was a countercultural protagonist, author and contributor to the UK Underground press, colleague of R.D. Laing, notable for starting the Freightliners free school. Diski was a regular contributor to the London Review of Books; the collections Don't and Why Didn't You Do What You Were Told? collect articles and essays written for the publication. Her memoirs include In Gratitude, The Sixties, Skating to Antarctica, and Stranger on a Train: Daydreaming and Smoking around America With Interruptions, for which she won the 2003 Thomas Cook Travel Book Award.
- Benjamin Disraeli (1804–1881) novelist, poet, playwright, writer, and prime minister A prolific novelist, the 1840s Disraeli wrote a trilogy of novels with political themes. Coningsby attacks the evils of the Whig Reform Bill of 1832 and castigates the leaderless conservatives for not responding. Sybil; or, The Two Nations (1845) reveals Peel's betrayal over the Corn Laws. These themes are expanded in Tancred (1847). With Coningsby; or, The New Generation (1844).
- Isaac D'Israeli, (11 May 1766 – 19 January 1848) was a British writer, scholar and the father of British prime minister Benjamin Disraeli. He is best known for his essays and his associations with other men of letters.
- Michael Pinto-Duschinsky (born June 1943) Hungarian-born author, journalist, scholar, political consultant and writer.
- Anton Ehrenzweig (27 November 1908 – 5 December 1966) Austrian Jewish British author and theorist on modern art, psychoanalysis and Avant-garde music who wroteThe Psychoanalysis of Artistic Vision and Hearing (1953) and The Hidden Order of Art (1967).
- Norbert Elias; (1897-1990) sociologist especially famous for theory of civilising/decivilising processes; was deeply involved in the German Zionist movement, and acted as one of the leading intellectuals within the German-Jewish youth movement "Blau-Weiss" (Blue-White). Elias' most famous work is The Civilizing Process
- Samantha Ellis is an Iraqi Jewish British playwright and writer best known for her books How to be a Heroine, Chopping Onions on My Heart, and her play How to Date a Feminist.
- Richard Ellmann literary scholar and biographer
- Aaron Esterson (23 September 1923 – 15 April 1999) prolific author and psychiatrist who was one of the founders of the Philadelphia Association along with R. D. Laing, with whom he wrote Sanity, Madness, and the Family. He wrote four other scholarly texts on psychiatry and existentialism as well as countless academic papers and monographs.
- Hans Eysenck (4 March 1916 – 4 September 1997); author of over fifty books and numerous academic papers; of German Jewish maternal lineage; psychologist best remembered for his work on intelligence and personality, although he worked on other issues in psychology. At the time of his death, Eysenck was the most frequently cited living psychologist in the peer-reviewed scientific journal literature.
- Henry Ezriel (c1910-1985) was a Kleinian analyst and author who pioneered group analysis at the Tavistock Clinic; best known as the originator of one of the Malan triangles; worked alongside W. R. Bion as consultant psychiatrist to the Tavistock. There he developed his method of psychoanalytic group work centred on group tensions and on transferences between members, and between members and the group.
- Moris Farhi writer (Turkish-born)
- Benjamin Farjeon (12 May 1838 – 23 July 1903) was an English novelist, playwright, printer and journalist. As an author, he was known for his huge output and frequently compared to Charles Dickens as a social novelist. He was the father of J. Jefferson Farjeon, Eleanor Farjeon, Herbert Farjeon, and Harry Farjeon.
- Eleanor Farjeon (13 February 1881 – 5 June 1965) English author of children's stories and plays, poetry, biography, history and satire. Several of her works had illustrations by Edward Ardizzone. Her most famous work was Morning Has Broken, a Christian hymn first published in 1931.
- Andrew Feinstein author of The Shadow World: Inside the Global Arms Trade, an investigation into the global arms industry. A board member of Declassified UK.
- David Feldman (historian) author and professor at Birkbeck College, University of London; director of the Pears Institute for the study of Antisemitism, launched in 2010, as a centre for research, teaching, and public policy formation relating to antisemitism and racial intolerance. His research relates to the history of minorities and their place in British society from 1600 to the current time.
- Eva Figes (15 April 1932 – 28 August 2012), anti-Zionist author and feminist; wrote novels, literary criticism, studies of feminism, and memoirs relating to Berlin childhood and experiences as Jewish refugee from Hitler's Germany.
- Orlando Figes (born 1959) historian, author, known for works on Russian history; has also contributed on European history with his book The Europeans (2019); has served on editorial board of journal Russian History; writes for international press, broadcasts on television and radio, reviews for The New York Review of Books, and is fellow of Royal Society of Literature; was historical consultant on film Anna Karenina starring Keira Knightley and Jude Law with screenplay by Tom Stoppard; historical consultant on BBC War & Peace television series.
- Antonia Forest (26 May 1915 – 28 November 2003) was the pseudonym of Patricia Giulia Caulfield Kate Rubinstein, an English writer. She wrote 13 books for children, published between 1948 and 1982. Her 10 best-known works concern the doings of the fictional Marlow family. Forest also wrote two historical novels about the Marlows' Elizabethan ancestors.
- Dov Forman (b. 2003); author and social media creator; uses social media to educate people about the Holocaust and Judaism, and to advocate against antisemitism; co-authored Lily's Promise, a book documenting the Holocaust; received the 'Points of Light' award for services to Holocaust education; included in the inaugural TIME100 Creators list; was selected for the inaugural Masa Changemakers List, honouring 18 global leaders from Masa's 200,000+ alumni. Forman was a Masa participant during his time in Israel as a Nitzavim Fellow, studying at the Hebrew University of Jerusalem and a Talmudic college in Jerusalem.
- Gilbert Frankau writer
- Pamela Frankau (3 January 1908 – 8 June 1967) popular novelist from a prominent artistic and literary family who wrote over thirty novels; grandmother was novelist Julia Frankau; father was Gilbert Frankau; partner was Italian-Jewish poet Humbert Wolfe.
- Sally Herbert Frankel (1903–1996) author of over five influential texts on economics and colonial settlement in South Africa; Professor of Colonial Economic Affairs and Economics of Underdeveloped Countries at Oxford University in period following Second World War; originally from South Africa, of German-Jewish descent, he moved to England after the Second World War. He joined the Mont Pelerin Society in 1950. Frankel was committed to principle of Jewish peoplehood and was keen Zionist.
- Ronald Frankenberg (1929–2015); anthropologist and sociologist, known for his study of conflict and decision-making and development of medical anthropology; was member of Manchester School of British Social Anthropology; was married to Dr. Pauline Frankenberg (née Hunt), author of Gender and Class Consciousness (1980). One of his daughters was sociologist Ruth Frankenberg.
- Ruth Frankenberg (1957–2007); social scientist and feminist, known for her pioneering work in field of whiteness studies; author of White Women, Race Matters: The Social Construction of Whiteness; prolific contributor to many journals on the study of whiteness, including her essay The Mirage of an Unmarked Whiteness. In White Women, Race Matters: The Social Construction of Whiteness, Frankenberg argues race shapes both the lives of the oppressor (white people, according to Frankenberg) as well as the oppressed. Frankenberg examined ways in which Ashkenazi Jewish women experience a sense of cultural belonging, but do not consider their Jewish faith to be classified a formal "race".
- Harry Freedman (born 1950) London born writer of books about Jewish history and culture. Works include Leonard Cohen: The Mystical Roots of Genius (2021, ISBN 978-1-4729-8730-3), The Talmud: A Biography, (2014, ISBN 978-1-4729-0594-9) and Shylock's Venice, The Remarkable History of Venice's Jews and the Ghetto (2024, ISBN 978-1-3994-0727-4).
- Gillian Freeman (1929–2019) novelist and screenwriter; best known for her screenplays for The Leather Boys, I Want What I Want (film) and Only Lovers Left Alive (novel)
- Hadley Freeman (born 15 May 1978) American British journalist based in London; writes for the Jewish Chronicle, The Guardian and Vogue; of Austro-Hungarian and Polish Jewish ancestry.
- Anna Freud CBE (3 December 1895 – 9 October 1982); psychoanalyst of Austrian–Jewish descent; born in Vienna; youngest child of Sigmund Freud and Martha Bernays and followed path of father and contributed to field of psychoanalysis; alongside Hermine Hug-Hellmuth and Melanie Klein, is considered founder of psychoanalytic child psychology.
- Stephen Fry (born 24 August 1957) is an English actor, broadcaster, comedian, director, narrator and writer. He has written novels, non fiction, scripts and autobiography.
- Frank Furedi (born 1947) is a Hungarian Jewish British Canadian academic known for work on sociology of fear, education, therapy culture, paranoid parenting and sociology of knowledge; in 1970s, was member of International Socialists (IS); later formed the Revolutionary Communist Group, and then broke from that to form Revolutionary Communist Tendency, refounded as the Revolutionary Communist Party in 1978; RCP was distinguished by its contrarianism; among its positions were support for IRA and Saddam Hussein Furedi is now associated with the RCP's successor, the web site Spiked Online.
- Neil Gaiman fantasy writer
- Uri Geller (Hebrew: אורי גלר; born 20 December 1946 in British Mandate of Palestine Mandatory Palestine (now Israel), of Hungarian Jewish ancestry, is an Israeli-British illusionist, magician, television personality, self-proclaimed psychic and author of over ten books, both fiction and non-fiction.
- Ernest Gellner social anthropologist, scholar of nationalism and identity, of Austrian Jewish and Czech Jewish origin.
- Adele Geras, (née Weston; born 15 March 1944) FRSL is an English writer for young children, teens and adults. She has written more than 95 books for children, young adults, and adults.
- Norman Geras (25 August 1943 – 18 October 2013); political theorist of Rhodesian Jewish origin; Professor Emeritus of Politics at the University of Manchester; author of over ten scholarly and historical texts, mostly focused on radical politics; contributed to analysis of Karl Marx in Marx and Human Nature; in 2006, he was one of the principal authors of the Euston Manifesto.
- Martin Gilbert CBE FRSL (25 October 1936 – 3 February 2015); historian and honorary Fellow of Merton College, Oxford; author of 88 books, including works on Winston Churchill, the 20th century, and Jewish history including the Holocaust; was a member of the Chilcot Inquiry into Britain's role in the Iraq War; noted for his endorsement of Bat Ye'or and Eurabia theory, providing comment for her book, stating that the theory "is 100 percent accurate". One of Gilbert's last books, In Ishmael's House: A History of the Jews in Muslim Lands cited Ye'or with approval several times.
- Morris Ginsberg FBA (14 May 1889 – 31 August 1970) British sociologist and prolific author who played a key role in the development of the discipline of sociology. He served as editor of The Sociological Review in the 1930s and later became the founding chairman of the British Sociological Association in 1951 and its first President (1955–1957). He was president of the Aristotelian Society from 1942 to 1943, and helped draft the UNESCO 1950 statement titled The Race Question.
- Maurice Glasman, Baron Glasman (born 8 March 1961) prolific author, political theorist, academic, social commentator, and Labour life peer in the House of Lords; senior lecturer in Political Theory at London Metropolitan University and Director of its Faith and Citizenship Programme; best known as a founder of Blue Labour, a term he coined in 2009;called on the Labour Party to establish dialogue with the far-right English Defence League (EDL) in order to challenge their views; called for some immigration to be temporarily halted and for the right of free movement of labour, a key provision of the Treaty of Rome, to be abrogated, dividing opinion among Labour commentators.; accepted the visiting professorship he was offered by Haifa University, telling The Jewish Chronicle: "If people I know say they want to boycott Israel, I say they should start by boycotting me". At the 2016 Limmud conference, he suggested the Labour Party's antisemitism harked back to Jewish Marxists, who wanted to "liberate Jews" from their Judaism.
- Ralph Glasser wrote Growing up in the Gorbals
- Donny Gluckstein (b. 1954); historian at Edinburgh College; son of Tony Cliff and Chanie Rosenberg, is author of numerous books and articles; his book A People's History of the Second World War shortlisted for the Bread and Roses Award.
- Ian Goldin professor at University of Oxford, author of over twenty books and 60 scholarly academic monographs, founding director of the Oxford Martin School at the University of Oxford; currently the director of the Oxford Martin Research Programmes on Technological and Economic Change, Future of Work and Future of Development; also Professor of Globalisation and Development and holds a professorial fellowship at Balliol College at the University of Oxford; was principal economist at the European Bank for Reconstruction and Development (EBRD) in London, and program director at the OECD in Paris, where he directed the Development Centre's Programs on Trade, Environment and Sustainable Development; was chief executive and managing director of the Development Bank of Southern Africa (DBSA); served as adviser to President Nelson Mandela;
- Louis Golding novelist
- Lawrence Goldman FRHistS (b.1957) ; historian, academic, Executive Editor of History Reclaimed, journalist; has written for Daily Mail, The Guardian, The Daily Telegraph, was director of the Oxford Dictionary of National Biography and of the Institute of Historical Research, University of London.
- Vivien Goldman British author and academic of German Jewish ancestry, focusing on the historiography, Praxis (process), dialectic and epistemology of punk rock, dub, and reggae.
- Lewis Goldsmith journalist and political writer
- Carl Gombrich author of numerous scholarly monographs, academic papers and articles on mysticism, epistemology, ontology, dialectics and music; former opera singer and co-founder of the London Interdisciplinary School; grandson of Ernst Gombrich; son of Sacred Sanskrit and Pali Literature scholar, Richard Gombrich.
- Ernst Gombrich art historian of Viennese Jewish origin.
- Richard Gombrich writer of Viennese Jewish ancestry, British Indologist and scholar of Sanskrit, Pāli, and Buddhist studies; historian of Tripiṭaka, Sthavira nikāya, Mahāsāṃghika schools, Abhidharma, Vinaya, Theravada, and ancient collections of Buddhist texts
- David Graeber British-American author, academic, scholar and anti capitalist anarchist activist, writer of Ashkenazi origin.
- Linda Grant FRSL (born 15 February 1951) is an English novelist and journalist. She published her first book, a non-fiction work, Sexing the Millennium: A Political History of the Sexual Revolution, in 1993. She wrote a personal memoir of her mother's fight with vascular dementia called Remind Me Who I Am, Again, which was cited in a discussion about ageing on BBC Radio 4's Thinking Allowed in December 2003.
- Dominic Green (born 1970) is a British historian, columnist and musician. A Fellow of the Royal Historical Society and the Royal Society of Arts, he is editor of the US edition of The Spectator and a commissioning editor of The Critic. He is a columnist and film reviewer for The Spectator, and a columnist for The Daily Telegraph.
- Wendy Greengross (29 April 1925 – 10 October 2012); author of books on pastoral care and counselling, journalist, general practitioner and broadcaster. The Independent called her "a pioneering counsellor and one of the leading figures in fighting for equal rights for the disabled and the elderly"; went into broadcasting, joining BBC Radio 4 counselling programme If You Think You've Got Problems; also had her own television show on BBC1, Let's Talk it Over; father was mayor of Holborn, and brother Sir Alan Greengross (born 1929) was Conservative member of Greater London Council.
- Tony Greenstein (born December 1953) is a left-wing anti-fascist, anti-Zionist writer activist, whose father came from a rabbinical family. Author of The Fight Against Fascism in Brighton & the South Coast, Zionism: Antisemitism's twin in Jewish garb and Zionism During the Holocaust: Weaponising Memory in the Service of State and Nation.
- John Hajnal (born Hajnal-Kónyi; 26 November 1924 – 30 November 2008), was Hungarian-British academic in fields of mathematics and economics (statistics); author of numerous monographs and academic papers and a book on the inefficacy of the British education system “The student trap: A critique of university and sixth-form curricula”; best known for identifying, in landmark 1965 paper, the historical pattern of marriage of northwest Europe in which people married late and many adults remained single. The geographical boundary of this unusual marriage pattern is now known as the Hajnal line; also worked on demography for United Nations, and for the Office of Population Research, Princeton University; was member of the International Statistical Institute and was elected FBA.
- Charlotte Haldane (27 April 1894 – 16 March 1969) was a British writer known as a feminist but also for anti-feminism in her 1927 book, Motherhood and its Enemies. In 1937 she worked as editor of the anti-fascist magazine Woman Today. and during the Spanish Civil War she took part in fund-raising activities on behalf of the International Brigades.In 1941 she went to Moscow to report on Soviet defense against the Nazis.
- Keith Kahn-Harris author, sociologist and music critic; honorary research fellow and senior lecturer at Birkbeck College and an associate fellow of the Institute for Jewish Policy Research and a lecturer at Leo Baeck College; has published academic and non-academic articles on Judaism, music scenes, heavy metal music, transgression, Israel, communities, dialogue, religion, ethnicity, political discourse, and denial; also writes for Medium, The Guardian, The Independent, Times of Israel, Haaretz, The Herald (Scotland), New Statesman, Times Higher Education (THE), The i Paper, openDemocracy; from 2001 to 2002 was "Jerusalem Fellow" at the Mandel School for Advanced Educational Leadership in Jerusalem.
- Efraim Halevy (Hebrew: אפרים הלוי; born in London, 2 December 1934); Israeli intelligence expert and diplomat; was director of Mossad and 3rd head of Israeli National Security Council; author of Man in the Shadows, covering Middle Eastern history since the late 1980s; nephew of Sir Isaiah Berlin; has written for The Washington Post, Jerusalem Post, Times of Israel, Haaretz, Foreign Affairs, Ynet News, The Forward
- Simon Hattenstone (born 29 December 1962 in Salford, England) journalist and writer; features writer and interviewer for The Guardian. He has also written or ghost-written a number of biographical books.
- Paula Heimann; (2 February 1899 – 22 October 1982), author, academic, psychiatrist and psychoanalyst who established phenomenon of countertransference as important tool of psychoanalytic treatment, publishing influential studies, texts, academic papers and monographs; member of British Psychoanalytical Society; author of monograph A contribution to the problem of sublimation and paper On counter-transference, presented at the Psychoanalytical Congress in 1949 in Zurich, led to rift with Kleinian group of analysts; later turned to the Independents group and was Margarete Mitscherlich's analyst; Alexander Mitscherlich also underwent training analysis with her.
- Margot Heinemann (18 November 1913 – 10 June 1992) was a British Marxist writer, drama scholar, and leading member of the Communist Party of Great Britain (CPGB).
- David Held (27 August 1951 – 2 March 2019) was a British political scientist who specialised in political theory and international relations; author of over twenty five scholarly academic texts and monographs.
- Basil Henriques
- Muriel Gray FRSE (born 30 August 1958) is a Scottish author, broadcaster and journalist, of Jewish ancestry. Gray has been a columnist for many publications, including Time Out magazine, the Sunday Correspondent, the Sunday Mirror, and Bliss magazine, and writes regularly for the Sunday Herald. and The Guardian.
- Zoë Heller author (Jewish father), daughter of screenwriter Lukas Heller; her paternal grandfather was the political philosopher Hermann Heller. Her brother is screenwriter Bruno Heller. Her sister, Lucy Heller Chief Executive of education charity Ark
- Noreena Hertz (born 24 September 1967) author, hosted "MegaHertz: London Calling", on SiriusXM's Insight channel and ITV News Economics Editor; wife of Danny Cohen (television executive), who previously held posts as Director of BBC Television and Controller of BBC One; from 1996 to 1997 she worked on the Middle East peace process with Palestinians, Egyptians, Israelis and Jordanians; honorary professor at University College London; Guardian op-ed writer. great-granddaughter of Joseph Hertz (Chief Rabbi of the British Empire)
- Chaim Herzog(Hebrew: חיים הרצוג; 17 September 1918 – 17 April 1997) Northern-Irish-born Israeli politician, general, lawyer and author of over five books on the Arab-Israeli conflict, who served as the sixth President of Israel; born in Belfast, raised in Dublin, the son of Ireland's Chief Rabbi Yitzhak HaLevi Herzog, he immigrated to Mandatory Palestine in 1935 and served in Haganah Jewish paramilitary group during the 1936–1939 Arab revolt; returned to Palestine after the war and, following the end of the British Mandate and Israel's Declaration of Independence in 1948, fought in the Battles of Latrun during the 1948 Arab–Israeli War; retired from Israel Defence Forces in 1962 with rank of major-general.His son Isaac Herzog is the incumbent President of Israel, the first father–son pair to serve as the nation's president, and led the Israeli Labor Party and the parliamentary Opposition in the Knesset between 2013 and 2017.
- Rosalyn Higgins, Baroness Higgins GBE, KC (born 2 June 1937); author of several influential works on international law, including Problems and Process: International Law and How We Use It (1994); former president of International Court of Justice (ICJ); was first female judge elected to the ICJ, and was elected to three-year term as president in 2006; became Queen's Counsel (QC) in 1986, and is bencher of the Inner Temple; served on the UN Human Rights Committee for 14 years; resigned from the Human Rights Committee when she was elected to the International Court of Justice on 12 July 1995, re-elected on 6 February 2000, and ended her second term on 6 February 2009. Her professional appointments include Specialist in International Law, Royal Institute of International Affairs, 1963–1974; Visiting Fellow, London School of Economics, 1974–1978;Professor of International Law, University of Kent at Canterbury, 1978–1981; Professor of International Law, University of London (London School of Economics), 1981–1995; Vice President, British Institute of International and Comparative Law; Member of the UN Human Rights Committee.
- David Hirsh (born 29 September 1967) author and scholar; professor in Sociology at Goldsmiths, University of London, and co-founder of Engage, a campaign against the academic boycott of Israel.
- Eric Hobsbawm Marxist historian of Viennese Jewish origin.
- Anthony Horowitz works include the Alex Rider series
- Eva Ibbotson (née Wiesner; 21 January 1925 – 20 October 2010) was an Austrian-born British novelist, known for her children's literature.
- Jeremy Isaacs (born 28 September 1932) author of four books; creator of The World at War, British documentary television series chronicling the events of the Second World War recipient of many British Academy Television Awards and International Emmy Awards; won the British Film Institute Fellowship in 1986, the International Emmy Directorate Award in 1987 and the BAFTA Fellowship in 1985, General Director of the Royal Opera House, Covent Garden from 1987 to 1996; was the founding chief executive of Channel 4 between 1981 and 1987.
- Jonathan Israel FBA (b. 1946); historian specialising in Dutch history, the Age of Enlightenment, Spinoza's Philosophy and European Jews; Professor at Institute for Advanced Study, Princeton, New Jersey, previously Professor at University College London; has focused his attention on multi-volume history of the Age of Enlightenment, contrasting two camps; "radical Enlightenment" was founded on rationalist materialism articulated by Spinoza and in opposition was "moderate Enlightenment" which he sees as weakened by its belief in God.
- Naomi Jacob, (1 July 1884 – 27 August 1964), also known by the pen name Ellington Gray, was an English writer, actress, broadcaster and lesbian of Jewish origin. Her father rejected his Jewish ancestry but Naomi Jacob embraced it.
- Joseph Jacobs folklorist
- Howard Jacobson (born 1942) author; has described himself as "a Jewish Jane Austen" (in response to being described as "the English Philip Roth"), and also states, "I'm not by any means conventionally Jewish. I don't go to shul. What I feel is that I have a Jewish mind, I have a Jewish intelligence. I feel linked to previous Jewish minds of the past. I don't know what kind of trouble this gets somebody into, a disputatious mind. What a Jew is has been made by the experience of 5,000 years, that's what shapes the Jewish sense of humour, that's what shaped Jewish pugnacity or tenaciousness." Jacobson expressed concern over antisemitism in the Labour Party under Jeremy Corbyn's leadership.
- Ruth Prawer Jhabvala novelist and screenwriter
- Gabriel Josipovici novelist and short story writer
- Ben Judah (born 1988) British journalist and the author of This Is London and Fragile Empire;son of author Tim Judah; of Baghdadi Jewish descent; was a policy fellow in London at the European Council on Foreign Relations; has also been a visiting fellow at the European Stability Initiative in Istanbul; was a research fellow at the Hudson Institute in Washington D.C. In 2020, he joined the Atlantic Council in Washington D.C. as a Nonresident Senior Fellow. Judah has written for various progressive and conservative think-tanks including The Center For American Progress (CAP) and Policy Exchange.
- Tim Judah (born 31 March 1962) is a British writer of Iraqi Jewish ancestry, reporter and political analyst for The Economist. Judah has written several books on the geopolitics of the Balkans, mainly focusing on Serbia and Kosovo.^{[a]}
- Tony Judt (2 January 1948 – 6 August 2010) was a British-American historian, essayist and university professor of Russian Jewish and Romanian Jewish ancestry, who specialised in European history;in aftermath of the Six-Day War, Judt worked as a driver and translator for the Israel Defense Forces. After the war, Judt's belief in the Zionist enterprise began to unravel and he then called for the conversion of "Israel from a Jewish state to a binational one" that would include all of what is now Israel, Gaza, East Jerusalem, and the West Bank.
- Anthony Julius (born 16 July 1956) author of Trials of the Diaspora: A History of Anti-Semitism in England.Known for being Diana, Princess of Wales' divorce lawyer and for representing Deborah Lipstadt in trial against David Irving.
- Ann Jungman (born 1938) is an author of children's literature. She was born in Highgate, North London of German Jewish refugees. She studied Law at Exeter University before training as a primary school teacher. She founded Barn Owl Books in 1999, an independent publishing company that re-releases out-of-print children's books, publishing 8 books a year.

== Authors, K–Z ==
- Mary Kaldor CBE (born 16 March 1946); British academic of Hungarian Jewish ancestry; Professor of Global Governance at the London School of Economics and Director of the Civil Society and Human Security Research Unit; teaches at Institut Barcelona d'Estudis Internacionals (IBEI); key figure in development of cosmopolitan democracy; writes on globalisation, international relations and humanitarian intervention, global civil society and global governance and New Wars;daughter of economist, scholar and author Nicholas Kaldor
- Nicholas Kaldor (12 May 1908 – 30 September 1986) born Káldor Miklós, was a Cambridge economist and author of over thirty scholarly academic texts and monographs; developed the "compensation" criteria called Kaldor–Hicks efficiency for welfare comparisons (1939), derived the cobweb model, and argued for certain regularities observable in economic growth, which are called Kaldor's growth laws.
- Oliver Kamm (born 1963); journalist and writer who is a leader writer and columnist for The Times; The Jewish Chronicle, Prospect magazine, and The Guardian.
- John Kampfner, author, broadcaster and commentator; executive director at Chatham House; has written and presented for Reuters, The Daily Telegraph; chief political correspondent at the Financial Times; political commentator for BBC's Today radio programme; political correspondent on Newsnight; was chair of the Clore Duffield Foundation, Council of King's College London; Chief Executive of the freedom of expression organisation Index on Censorship and established Creative Industries Federation; shortlisted for the Orwell Book prize.
- Efraim Karsh (born 6 September 1953) British-Israeli historian at King's College London; director of political studies Bar-Ilan University the Begin-Sadat Center for Strategic Studies).; former director of Middle East Forum; held posts at Harvard, Columbia universities, Sorbonne, London School of Economics, Helsinki University, International Institute for Strategic Studies, Kennan Institute for Advanced Russian Studies in Washington D.C., and Jaffee Center for Strategic Studies at Tel Aviv University; in 1989 joined King's College London; has contributed articles to The New York Times, The Los Angeles Times, The Wall Street Journal, The Times (London) and The Daily Telegraph. His book Palestine Betrayed argued that 1948 Palestinian expulsion and flight was "exclusively of their own making".
- Gerald Kaufman (21 June 1930 – 26 February 2017) politician, journalist, broadcaster and author who served as a minister throughout the Labour government of 1974 to 1979; elected as member of parliament (MP) at the 1970 general election, he became Father of the House and served until 2017; served as chair of the Culture, Media and Sport Committee; was knighted in 2004; was assistant general secretary of Fabian Society; was leader writer on Daily Mirror and journalist on New Statesman; also worked as television writer, contributing to BBC Television's satirical programme That Was The Week That Was; was member of Poale Zion (later the Jewish Labour Movement) but became disillusioned with Israel because of its treatment of the Palestinian territories.
- Michael Kauffmann FBA (5 February 1931 – 30 June 2023), art historian and author of numerous scholarly monographs and academic publications; Director of the Courtauld Institute, London and Fellow of the British Academy; held posts at the Warburg Institute, Manchester City Art Gallery, and the Victoria and Albert Museum; was son of noted art historian, art dealer and scholar Arthur Kauffmann, both of German Jewish ancestry; died on 30 June 2023, at the age of 92.
- Adam Kay (writer) (born 12 June 1980) comedy writer, author, comedian and former doctor. His television writing credits include Crims, Mrs. Brown's Boys and Mitchell and Webb. He is best known as author of the number-one bestselling book This Is Going to Hurt.
- Hans Keller (11 March 1919 – 6 November 1985) was a Viennese Jewish British musician and prolific writer, who made significant contributions to musicology and music criticism; best known for his appearance on TV show The Look of the Week in which he interviewed Syd Barrett and Roger Waters. Keller was generally puzzled by, or even contemptuous of, the group and its music, opening with the comment "why has it all got to be so terribly loud?"
- Judith Kerr, OBE (surname pronounced /ˈkɑːr/ KAR German pronunciation: [kɛʁ]; 14 June 1923 – 22 May 2019) was a German-born British writer and illustrator whose books sold more than 10 million copies around the world. She created both enduring picture books such as the Mog series and The Tiger Who Came to Tea and novels for older children such as the semi-autobiographical When Hitler Stole Pink Rabbit, which gave a child's-eye view of escaping Hitler's persecution in the Second World War. Born in the Weimar Republic, she came to Britain with her family in 1935 to escape persecution during the rise of the Nazis.
- Gerald Kersh, novelist
- Beeban Kidron, Baroness Kidron, (b. 1961), author of Penguin Books Users: How Big Tech Took Control and How to Fight Back; filmmaker, politician and social activist; advocate for children's rights in the digital world; establishing standards for online safety and privacy across the world; sits as a crossbench peer in the United Kingdom's House of Lords; she is an advisor to the Institute for Ethics of artificial intelligence at Oxford University, a commissioner on the Broadband Commission for Sustainable Development, and founder of 5Rights Foundation; sister of record producer Adam Kidron; daughter of British Israeli of South African origin, Michael Kidron, founder of leftist Pluto Press; niece of Socialist Workers Party founder Tony Cliff and activist Chanie Rosenberg, and the cousin of historian Donny Gluckstein.; appointed Officer of the Order of the British Empire (OBE) in the 2012 Birthday Honours for services to drama.
- Sophia King (later Fortnum; b. 1781/2, d. in or after 1805) Gothic novelist and poet, and sister of Gothic writer Charlotte Dacre. She contributed to poetry periodicals under the nom-de-plume "Sappho".
- Jacky Klein (born 28 January 1977) art historian, broadcaster, author; co-presented Britain's Lost Masterpieces for BBC4; co-authored book with sister, Suzy Klein, What is Contemporary Art? A Children's Guide, commissioned by the Museum of Modern Art, New York, published by Thames & Hudson; has also authored works on Wyndham Lewis and Grayson Perry; in 2015, was Executive Editor at Tate Publishing
- Melanie Klein (30 March 1882 – 22 September 1960), Austrian Jewish British author and psychoanalyst known for work in child analysis; was primary figure in development of object relations theory, suggesting that pre-verbal existential anxiety in infancy catalysed formation of unconscious, resulting in unconscious splitting of the world into good and bad idealizations; how child resolves that split depends on constitution of child and the character of nurturing the child experiences, and quality of resolution can inform presence, absence, and/or type of distresses a person experiences later in life.
- Suzy Klein (born 1 April 1975) author and radio and television presenter; Head of Arts and Classical Music TV for the BBC; winner of William Hardcastle Award for Journalism; was assistant producer at BBC Radio 4 on programmes including Start the Week; then moved to BBC Television, working as director and producer on arts and music films. In 2008, she presented the Proms season on BBC Two; has also presented The Culture Show, BBC Young Musician of the Year and The Review Show; For Sky Arts, hosted programmes on Sky Arts 2; also presented Aida from Royal Albert Hall (March 2012) for The Rosenblatt Recitals; was named Music Broadcaster of the Year, winning the Silver Prize at the Sony Awards; has presented global opera broadcasts for Royal Opera, London, and hosted broadcasts of the Royal Shakespeare Company; in 2021, appointed Head of Arts and Classical Music TV.
- Matthew Kneale, writer (Jewish mother)
- Matthew Kramer (born 9 June 1959) author and editor of over twenty scholarly texts; philosopher and signatory of the Euston Manifesto; currently Professor of Legal and Political Philosophy at the University of Cambridge and a Fellow of Churchill College, Cambridge. He writes mainly in the areas of metaethics, normative ethics, legal philosophy, and political philosophy; Director of the Cambridge Forum for Legal and Political Philosophy; elected a Fellow of the British Academy, the United Kingdom's national academy for the humanities and social sciences.
- Arthur Koestler, novelist and critic
- Bernard Kops, poet
- Peter Kosminsky (born 21 April 1956) is a British writer, director, screenwriter and producer; has directed Hollywood movies such as White Oleander and television films like Warriors, The Government Inspector, The Promise, Wolf Hall and The State.
- Elena Lappin is a writer and editor. She was born in Moscow, grew up in Prague and Hamburg, and has lived in Israel, Canada, the United States, and – longer than anywhere else – in England.
- Harold Laski, (30 June 1893 – 24 March 1950), prolific author of well over twenty five books, monographs and academic papers; was political theorist and economist of Lithuanian Jewish and Polish Jewish ancestry; served as chairman of the British Labour Party from 1945 to 1946; was professor at London School of Economics; after 1930, began to emphasize need for workers' revolution; was one of Britain's most influential intellectual spokesmen for Marxism in interwar years.; was supporter of Zionism and supported the creation of a Jewish state.
- Marghanita Laski (24 October 1915 – 6 February 1988); journalist, BBC radio panellist and novelist; also wrote literary biography, plays and short stories, and contributed about 250,000 additions to the Oxford English Dictionary; was science fiction critic for The Observer; was member of the Annan Committee on broadcasting between 1974 and 1977; joined Arts Council and was elected Vice Chair and served as the Chair of the Literature Panel. Her play, The Offshore Island, is about nuclear warfare.
- Adam LeBor (1961); author, journalist; foreign correspondent from 1991; now based in London; also lived in Ramat HaShofet kibbutz, Israel, Berlin and Paris; reported from the former Yugoslavia; covered collapse of Communism and Yugoslav wars for The Independent ;currently contributes to The Times, the Financial Times, where he reviews thrillers, The Critic, Monocle; works as editorial trainer and writing coach at Financial Times, Citywire and Monocle; former contributor to Harry's Place; has written eight non-fiction books, including Hitler's Secret Bankers, shortlisted for the Orwell Prize, a biography of Slobodan Milosevic, and City of Oranges, an account of Jewish and Arab families in Jaffa, shortlisted for the Jewish Quarterly Prize.
- Sir Sidney Lee (1859–1926), biographer and literary scholar
- Joseph Leftwich, writer, one of the Whitechapel Boys
- Antony Lerman (born 11 March 1946); author advocating One-state solution in Israel and Palestine; critic of the concept of the New antisemitism; explores meaning of Zionism and Anti-Zionism; from 2006 to early 2009, was Director of the Institute for Jewish Policy Research.
- David Levi, writer on Jewish subjects
- Amy Levy (10 November 1861 – 9 September 1889) was an English essayist, poet, and novelist best remembered for her literary gifts; her experience as the second Jewish woman at Cambridge University, and as the first Jewish student at Newnham College, Cambridge.
- Deborah Levy (born 6 August 1959); novelist, playwright and poet of South African and Lithuanian Jewish ancestry; her plays were staged by the Royal Shakespeare Company; novels included Beautiful Mutants, Swallowing Geography and Billy & Girl; recent fiction has included the Booker-shortlisted novels Swimming Home and Hot Milk, as well as the Booker-longlisted The Man Who Saw Everything and short-story collection Black Vodka;The Guardian ranked The Cost of Living number 84 in list of "The 100 best books of the 21st century".
- Gertrude Rachel Levy FSA (5 November 1883 – 10 October 1966), author and cultural historian writing about comparative mythology, matriarchy, epic poetry and archaeology; worked with Department of Antiquities in Mandatory Palestine.
- Paul Levy, food writer, biographer; long rabbinical pedigree
- Bernard Lewis (31 May 1916 – 19 May 2018); specialised in Oriental studies; public intellectual and political commentator; wrote over ten books on history of Islam and the interaction between Islam and the West; was called "the West's leading interpreter of the Middle East". Others have accused Lewis of having revived the image of cultural inferiority of Islam and of emphasising the dangers of jihad. His advice was frequently sought by neoconservative policymakers, including the Bush administration. However, his active support of the Iraq War and neoconservative ideals have since come under scrutiny.
- Maureen Lipman, (born 10 May 1946) is an English actress, columnist and comedian, who has published several collections of her comedy sketches, and autobiography. She trained at the London Academy of Music and Dramatic Art and her stage work has included appearances with the National Theatre and the Royal Shakespeare Company. She was made a dame in the 2020 Queen's Birthday Honours for services to charity, entertainment and the arts.
- David Littman (activist) (4 July 1933 – 20 May 2012) author of over five books and scores of monographs and academic papers and activist best known for organising the departure of Jewish children from Morocco; then worked as lobbyist at the United Nations in Geneva and was also historian. He was married to Bat Ye'or.
- Emanuel Litvinoff, novelist. (5 May 1915 – 24 September 2011) was a British writer and well-known figure in Anglo-Jewish literature, known for novels, short stories, poetry, plays and human rights campaigning. Litvinoff became aware of plight of persecuted Soviet Jews, and started worldwide campaign against this persecution. Due to Litvinoff's efforts, prominent Jewish groups in United States became aware of issue, and well-being of Soviet Jews became cause for a worldwide campaign, eventually leading to mass migration of Jews from the Soviet Union to Israel and the United States. For this he has been described by Meir Rosenne, former Israeli ambassador to the United States, as "one of the greatest unsung heroes of the twentieth century... who won in the fight against an evil empire" and that "thousands and thousands of Russian Jews owe him their freedom".
- Naftali Loewenthal, member of the Chabad Hasidic community; main area of study is Hasidism and Jewish Mysticism; professor in the Department of Hebrew and Jewish Studies at University College London; director of the Chabad Research Unit, a division of the Chabad-Lubavitch movement in United Kingdom; author of Communicating the Infinite: The Emergence of the Habad School (1990); also authored Hasidism Beyond Modernity: Essays in Habad Thought and History (2019) as well as many scholarly articles and publications on the Chabad mysticism; also extensively written on history of Chabad Hasidic women.
- Nick Lowles, founder of Hope Not Hate and former editor of the anti-fascist Searchlight (magazine), backed by various politicians and celebrities several trade unions. Knowles is the author of a number of books on football violence, right wing groups and antisemitism in Britain. He was a freelance investigative journalist, working in television, including on BBC Panorama, World in Action, Channel Four Dispatches and MacIntyre Undercover.
- Moshé Machover (Hebrew: משה מחובר; born 1936) is a mathematician, philosopher, pro Palestinian socialist anti-Zionist activist and author, noted for his writings critical of Israel and Zionism.
- David Magarshack (23 December 1899 – 26 October 1977); author, translator and biographer of Russian authors, best remembered for his translations of Dostoevsky, Chekhov and Nikolai Gogol; of Russian Jewish ancestry.
- Miriam Margolyes (born 18 May 1941) is a British and Australian actress. She has written two volumes of autobiography, This Much is True (2021) and Oh Miriam! (2023).
- Leo Marks, cryptographer and screenwriter
- Madeleine Masson Rayner (née Levy; 23 April 1912 – 23 August 2007), author of plays, film scripts, novels, memoirs and biographies; best known for her biography of the highly respected and decorated war heroine, Polish agent of the British Special Operations Executive, Krystyna Skarbek.
- Roy Masters (commentator) (born 2 April 1928, died 22 April 2021); English-born American author of over twenty self-help pop psychology books, radio personality, businessman and hypnotist.
- Anna Maxted, novelist and journalist. She is former Assistant Editor of Cosmopolitan, and has freelanced for most national newspapers and magazines, including The Independent on Sunday, The Daily Telegraph, The Daily Mirror, Sunday Mirror, The Times, Daily Express, FHM, Esquire and Living Etc.
- Mark Mazower (born 20 February 1958) historian, scholar, academic and author of over fifteen books, largely on fascism, Greece, the Balkans and 20th-century Europe; of Russian Jewish descent; has also written for the Financial Times and for The Independent; has been appointed to the Advisory Board of the European Association of History Educators (EUROCLIO) and is member of the Editorial Board for Past & Present. Mazower's book, No Enchanted Palace narrates origins of the United Nations and its ties to colonialism and its predecessor organisation, the League of Nations; in Governing the World, the history of international organisations is evaluated, beginning with the Concert of Europe at the start of the nineteenth century.
- Albert Meltzer (7 January 1920 – 7 May 1996), anarchist activist and writer; contributor to anarchist Freedom (British newspaper), which had been founded by Russian aristocrat revolutionary Peter Kropotkin; was co-founder of anarchist newspaper Black Flag; amongst his books were Anarchism, Arguments For and Against, The Floodgates of Anarchy (co-written with Stuart Christie) and his autobiography, I Couldn't Paint Golden Angels, published by AK Press.
- Donald Meltzer (1922–2004), Kleinian psychoanalyst; known for making clinical headway with childhood conditions such as autism; focused on role of emotionality and aesthetics in promoting mental health; considered key figure in theory of thinking created by Wilfred Bion; was member of Kleinian Imago Group which included Richard Wollheim, Wilfred Bion, Roger Money-Kyrle, Marion Milner and Ernst Gombrich.
- Charlotte Mendelson (b. November 1972); novelist, editor; placed 60th on the Independent on Sunday Pink List 2007; professor of creative writing at Royal Holloway, University of London; correspondent at the New Yorker; became a Fellow of the Royal Society of Literature in 2018; awards and nominations include John Llewellyn Rhys Prize, Somerset Maugham Award, Sunday Times 'Young Writer of the Year (shortlisted), London Arts New London Writers' Award, K. Blundell Trust Award, Le Prince Maurice Roman d'Amour Prize (shortlisted), Geoffrey Faber Memorial Prize (shortlisted), Man Booker Prize 2013 (longlisted) Baileys Women's Prize for Fiction 2014 (longlisted), Women's Prize for Fiction 2022 (longlisted for The Exhibitionist)
- Heather Mendick, Labour activist previously appointed as Jeremy Corbyn's Jewish liaison officer; former Hackney South constituency Labour party secretary, academic, previously Reader in Education at Brunel University and author of scholarly texts and monographs on educational theory, semantics, science, contemporary culture, ontology, ideology and epistemology, published by Routledge and McGraw Hill Education
- Farah Mendlesohn (b. 27 July 1968) is a British academic historian, best known for her writings on science fiction and fantasy.
- Gerard Menuhin, son of Yehudi Menuhin; grandson of leading anti-Zionist activist and scholar, Moshe Menuhin, and from the ancestral lineage of Rabbi Shneur Zalman of Liadi, the founder of Chabad Hassidism as well as Rabbi Levi Yitzchok of Berditchev.
- George Mikes, Hungarian-born comic writer
- Ralph Miliband (born Adolphe Miliband; 7 January 1924 – 21 May 1994) sociologist and Marxist author of Polish Jewish ancestry; father of Ed Miliband and David Miliband, described as "one of the best known academic Marxists of his generation", on a par with E. P. Thompson, Eric Hobsbawm and Perry Anderson.
- Beth Miller, novelist and nonfiction writer. Her first two novels were When We Were Sisters (Ebury, 2014) and The Good Neighbour (Ebury, 2015). The Two Hearts of Eliza Bloom (Bookouture, 2019), tells the story of Eliza, an Orthodox Jewish girl who runs away on the day of her arranged marriage; and The Missing Letters of Mrs Bright (Bookouture, 2020),
- Yvonne Mitchell (born Yvonne Frances Joseph; 7 July 1915) actress, playwright, biographer, novelist and author; acting roles include Julia in the 1954 BBC adaptation of George Orwell's novel Nineteen Eighty-Four; also an established author, writing several books for children and adults as well as winning awards for playwriting. Her plays include The Same Sky. She wrote an acclaimed biography of the French writer Colette, and her own autobiography was published in 1957.
- Santa Montefiore, author (convert)
- Simon Sebag Montefiore, author and Haaretz journalist;Jerusalem: The Biography was a number one non-fiction Sunday Times bestseller and a global bestseller and won The Jewish Book of the Year Award from the Jewish Book Council; descended from the banker Sir Joseph Sebag-Montefiore, the nephew and heir of the wealthy philanthropist Sir Moses Montefiore, considered by some "the most important Jew of the 19th century". Simon's mother was Phyllis April Jaffé (1927–2019) from the Lithuanian branch of the Jaffe family. The Montefiore family are descended from a line of wealthy Sephardi Jews who were diplomats and bankers all over Europe and who originated from Morocco and Italy.
- Eric Moonman (29 April 1929 – 22 December 2017) was Labour politician, chair of Poale Zion (Great Britain), president of Zionist Federation of Great Britain and Ireland; author of book The Violent Society; did consultancy work for ITN as expert in counter-terrorism'; appointed as member of the advisory board of the Centre for Counter Terrorism Studies at the Potomac Institute for Policy Studies.
- Benny Morris (Hebrew: בני מוריס; born 8 December 1948) Israeli historian of British Jewish ancestry;member of the group of Israeli historians known as the "New Historians", a term Morris coined to describe himself and historians Avi Shlaim, Ilan Pappé and Simha Flapan; Morris's work on the Arab–Israeli conflict and especially the Israeli–Palestinian conflict has won praise and criticism from both sides of the political divide. Morris regards himself as a Zionist.
- Maisie Mosco (7 December 1924 – 31 October 2011) wrote 16 novels between 1979 and 1998. These include the 'Almonds and Raisins' series (Almonds & Raisins, Scattered Seed, Children's Children, Out of the Ashes, and New Beginnings), about a Jewish family who around 1900 fled anti-Jewish pogroms in the Russian Empire and emigrated to north Manchester in England. These books contained elements of her own family history and were dramatized for BBC Radio 4.
- Michael Moritz KBE (b. 1954) billionaire venture capitalist, philanthropist, author, journalist; works for Sequoia Capital, wrote history of Apple Inc., The Little Kingdom, and Going for Broke: Lee Iacocca's Battle to Save Chrysler; was writer at Time magazine and member of board of directors of Google; founded Technologic Partners; named as the No. 1 venture capitalist on the Forbes Midas List; appointed Knight Commander of the Order of the British Empire (KBE).
- Claus Moser, Baron Moser, KCB, CBE (24 November 1922 – 4 September 2015) was a British statistician, scholar and author who made major contributions in both academia and the Civil Service. He held a very wide variety of posts, included Member, Governing Body, Royal Academy of Music, 1967–1979, Director, Central Statistical Office, 1968–1978, BBC Music Advisory Committee, 1971–1983, Visiting Fellow, Nuffield College, Oxford, 1972–1980, Chairman, Royal Opera House, Covent Garden, 1974–1987, Director, N M Rothschild & Sons, 1978–1990 (Vice-chairman, 1978–1984), President, Royal Statistical Society, 1978–1980, Chairman, Economist Intelligence Unit, 1979–1983, Warden of Wadham College, Oxford, 1984–1993, Chancellor, Keele University, 1986–2002, Trustee, London Philharmonic Orchestra, 1988–2000, President, British Association for the Advancement of Science, 1989–1990, Pro-Vice-Chancellor, University of Oxford, 1991–1993, Chairman, British Museum Development Trust, 1993–2003, later Chairman Emeritus, Chancellor, Open University of Israel, 1994–2004
- Moss, Celia (1819-1873 and Marion (1821-1901), Anglo-Jewish writers and educators, authors of poetry, prose and fiction, Marion Moss Hartog established the first Jewish women's periodical, the Jewish Sabbath Journal: A Penny and Moral Magazine for the Young, which foundered after it was attacked by the Jewish Chronicle.
- Lewis Namier (27 June 1888 – 19 August 1960), British historian of Polish-Jewish ancestry; descendant of Rabbi Elijah ben Solomon Zalman,(Hebrew: ר' אליהו בן שלמה זלמן) known as the Vilna Gaon; author of over twenty scholarly texts and authoritative monographs on sociopolitical typology and geopolitical analysis; held positions with Propaganda Department (1915–17), the Department of Information (1917–18) and with Political Intelligence Department of Foreign Office (1918–20); following defeat of Germany in World War One, Namier joined British delegation at Versailles Peace Conference of 1919; later Namier, who was a long-time Zionist, worked as political secretary for the Jewish Agency in Palestine (1929–31) and was close friend and associate of Chaim Weizmann; active in Zionist groups, lobbying British government to allow creation of Jewish Fighting Force in Mandate of Palestine and from 1933 was engaged in efforts on behalf of Jewish refugees from Germany. Namier used prosopography or collective biography of every Member of Parliament (MP) and peer who sat in the British Parliament in the latter 18th century to reveal that local interests, not national ones, often determined how parliamentarians voted. As former patient of Sigmund Freud, Namier was a believer in psychohistory.
- Saul Newman, anarchist scholar and activist,(born 22 March 1972) is a British political theorist who writes on post-anarchism. He is professor of political theory at Goldsmiths College, University of London.
- Susie Orbach (born 6 November 1946), psychotherapist, psychoanalyst, writer and social critic; daughter of Maurice Orbach, author of Fat is a Feminist Issue, married to author Jeanette Winterson. She is honoured in BBC'S 100 Women in 2013 and 2014. She was the therapist to Diana, Princess of Wales during the 1990s.
- Yotam Ottolenghi (born 14 December 1968), Israeli-British celebrity chef; journalist for The Guardian and Haaretz; author of several cookery books, including Ottolenghi: The Cookbook (2008), Plenty (2010), Jerusalem (2012). Moved to Europe after his service in Military Intelligence Directorate (Israel); in 2014, London Evening Standard remarked that Ottolenghi had "radically rewritten the way Londoners cook and eat"; in 2017 was guest judge on Masterchef Australia.
- Ilan Pappé, pro-Palestinian dissident Israeli-British scholar, writer and author of Ashkenazi origin, focusing on the history of Palestinian Nakba, intifada, insurgency, land ownership and rights and radical Anti-Zionism.
- Joseph Pardo (c. 1624 – 1677), hazzan and writer
- David Patrikarakos; journalist and war correspondent, author of War in 140 Characters: How Social Media Is Reshaping Conflict in the Twenty-First Century; wrote Nuclear Iran: Birth of An Atomic State which was named as a New York Times Editor's Choice and nominated for Total Politics Book Awards.
- Ruthie Pearlman, Orthodox Jewish Crime Writer and writer of Young Adult Fiction.
- Maurice Peston, Baron Peston (19 March 1931 – 23 April 2016) economist and Labour life peer; author of numerous scholarly academic texts and monographs on economics; research interests included macroeconomic policy and the economics of education; father of Robert Peston.
- Adam Phillips (psychologist)(born 19 September 1954) is a British psychoanalytic psychotherapist, essayist and author of well over twenty books, scholarly articles and academic papers; since 2003 he has been the general editor of the new Penguin Modern Classics translations of Sigmund Freud and is a regular contributor to the London Review of Books.
- Alexander Piatigorsky, writer, philosopher, culture theorist; winner of the 2002 Russian Bely Prize for literature
- Irma Brenman Pick (13 April 1934 – 3 August 2023) South African Latvian Jewish British psychologist and psychoanalyst known for her work on countertransference. She served as the president of the British Psychoanalytical Society from 1997 to 2000.
- Daniel Pick (born 1960); historian, psychoanalyst, university teacher, writer, broadcaster; was recipient of a senior Investigator grant from the Wellcome Trust and led research group at Birkbeck exploring history of the human sciences and 'psy' professions during the Cold War; project entitled 'Hidden Persuaders': Brainwashing, Culture, Clinical Knowledge and the Cold War Human Sciences, c. 1950–1990'; was fellow and training analyst of the British Psychoanalytical Society and author of numerous articles and several books on modern cultural history, psychoanalysis, and history of the human sciences. These include Faces of Degeneration (CUP, 1989), The Pursuit of the Nazi Mind (OUP, 2012). and Brainwashed: A New History of Thought Control (Profile/Wellcome Collection, 2022) He has written, and taught at London University for many years, on aspects of the history of psychoanalysis and psychiatry, modernism, the relationship of Freudian thought to historiography, Victorian evolutionary theory, eugenics and social Darwinism, ideas of war and peace, fin-de-siècle literature, and the history of cultural attitudes to crime and madness. He is an associate editor of History Workshop Journal. Pick has presented for the BBC, including 'The Unconscious Life of Bombs', BBC Radio 4 (December 2017); 'Dictators on the Couch', BBC Radio 4 (June 2017); and 'Freud for our Times', BBC Radio 4 (December 2016).
- Harold Pinter, Nobel prize-winning writer, playwright; Pinter signed the mission statement of Jews for Justice for Palestinians in 2005 and its full-page advertisement, "What Is Israel Doing? A Call by Jews in Britain", published in The Times on 6 July 2006, and he was a patron of the Palestine Festival of Literature. In April 2008, Pinter signed the statement "We're not celebrating Israel's anniversary". The statement noted: "We cannot celebrate the birthday of a state founded on terrorism, massacres and the dispossession of another people from their land.", "We will celebrate when Arab and Jew live as equals in a peaceful Middle East"
- Friedrich Pollock (22 May 1894 – 16 December 1970) was a German academic, author, social scientist, philosopher and colleague of Max Horkheimer and Theodor W. Adorno. He was one of the founders of the Institute for Social Research in Frankfurt am Main, and a member of the Frankfurt School of neo-Marxist theory; lived and wrote in London during the Nazi expulsion period, later exiled to Paris and New York.
- Michael Polanyi (Hungarian: Polányi Mihály; 11 March 1891 – 22 February 1976) was a Hungarian-British polymath and author, who made important theoretical contributions to physical chemistry, economics, and philosophy.
- Peter Pomerantsev (Russian: Питер Померанцев; born Pyotr Igorevich Pomerantsev, Пётр Игоревич Померанцев; born 1977); Soviet-born journalist, author and TV producer; Senior Fellow at the Institute of Global Affairs at London School of Economics; associate editor at Coda Media; has written two books about Russian disinformation and propaganda—Nothing Is True and Everything Is Possible and This Is Not Propaganda and a third, How to Win an Information War: The Propagandist Who Outwitted Hitler, on Sefton Delmer, British propagandist during World War II.
- Robert Popper (born 23 November 1967); comedy producer, script writer, actor, and satirical author; writing credits include South Park, The Comic Strip, the Channel 4 show, The Big Breakfast, Bo' Selecta!, Black Books, Spaced and Bremner, Bird and Fortune
- Michael Postan FBA (24 September 1899 – 12 December 1981), historian; born to Jewish family in Bendery, in Bessarabia Governorate of Russian Empire, studied at the St Vladimir University in Kyiv, leaving Russia in 1919 after October Revolution and settling in UK; held positions at University College London and London School of Economics, before being appointed Professor of Economic History at the University of Cambridge.Postan, who was head of the Russia section of the Ministry of Economic Warfare married Lady Cynthia Postan , debutante and secretary for MI5.
- Peter G. J. Pulzer (1929–2023), historian who was Gladstone Professor of Government at the University of Oxford; his book "The Emergence of Political Anti-Semitism in Germany and Austria 1867–1914" is still regarded as benchmark standard on the topic; received the Decoration of Honour for Services to the Republic of Austria.
- Frederic Raphael, FRSL (born 14 August 1931) is an American-born British novelist, biographer, journalist and Oscar-winning screenwriter, known for writing the screenplays for Darling, Far from the Madding Crowd, Two for the Road, and Stanley Kubrick's last film Eyes Wide Shut.
- David Renton (born 1972), author and barrister, was member of the Socialist Workers Party (SWP); has published books on fascism, anti-fascism and politics of left, notably Labour's Antisemitism Crisis: What the Left Got Wrong and How to Learn from it (Routledge, 2021) on presumed anti-Semitism in the British Labour Party; has also written for The Jewish Chronicle; Renton is grandson of shoe designer Kurt Geiger of Viennese Jewish ancestry, and related to Conservative MP Tim Renton, Baron Renton of Mount Harry; David Renton was educated at private boarding school Eton College where he became member of Labour Party; later studied history at St John's College, University of Oxford; in 2021, Renton represented Stan Keable of Labour Against the Witchhunt, at Employment Appeal Tribunal, which held that Keable was unfairly dismissed for events occurring at the "Enough is Enough" protests against Jeremy Corbyn. The EAT upheld an order that Keable should be reinstated.
- Dave Rich, Head of Policy at the Community Security Trust writes on what is perceived to be British left-wing antisemitism. He is an associate research fellow at the Pears Institute for the Study of Antisemitism. Rich has written a book, published in 2016, The Left's Jewish Problem: Jeremy Corbyn, Israel and Anti‑Semitism which began as his doctoral dissertation.
- Claudia Roden (born 1936), Egyptian-born cookery book writer and cultural anthropologist.
- John Rodker (18 December 1894 – 6 October 1955) was an English writer, modernist poet, and publisher of modernist writers and one of the "Whitechapel Boys", a group including Isaac Rosenberg, Mark Gertler, David Bomberg, Samuel Weinstein and Joseph Lefkowitz
- Herbert Rosenfeld (1910–1986); German Jewish British psychoanalyst; made seminal contributions to Kleinian thinking on psychotic and other very ill patients; has had wide impact on analysts both in Britain and internationally, exploring projective identification and theory of destructive narcissism.
- Adele Rose (8 December 1933 – 28 December 2020) was an English television writer. She was the longest-serving scriptwriter for the soap opera Coronation Street, writing 457 scripts over a period of 37 years from 1961, and was the first woman to write for the show. She also originated the series Byker Grove (1989–2006), aimed at teenagers.
- Gillian Rose; (20 September 1947 – 9 December 1995) philosopher and writer; held chair of social and political thought at the University of Warwick; taught at University of Sussex; worked in fields of philosophy and sociology, neo-Kantianism, post-modernism, political theology, speculative thought."
- Hilary Rose (sociologist) (born 1935) is a British sociologist and author of over ten books and more than 150 scholarly articles and papers; critic of Israel, Zionism and the continued settlement, colonisation and occupation of Palestinian land, calling for Academic boycott of Israel.
- Jacqueline Rose, FBA, FRSL (born 1949 in London) academic; Professor of Humanities at the Birkbeck Institute for the Humanities; scholar, and author of over ten books and monographs on psychoanalysis, epistemology, ontology and feminism; critical of Zionism, describing it as "[having] been traumatic for the Jews as well as the Palestinians".
- Nikolas Rose is a British sociologist and social theorist. He is Distinguished Honorary Professor at the Research School of Social Sciences, in the College of Arts and Social Sciences at the Australian National University and Honorary Professor at the Institute of Advanced Studies at University College London.
- Steven Rose (born 4 July 1938) neuroscientist, prolific author, social commentator; instrumental in calling for Academic boycott of Israel as long as Israel continues its occupation of the Palestinian Territories, on grounds of Israeli academics' close relationship with Israel Defense Forces; founding members of British Committee for the Universities of Palestine;regular panellist on BBC Radio 4's ethics debating series The Moral Maze.
- Connie Rosen, education writer (born 1919)in the East End of London; and BBC playwright. Author of The Language of Primary Schoolchildren, co-written with Harold Rosen Penguin, 1973, Penguin Education.
- Harold Rosen an American-born British educationalist who lived in the UK for most of his life. His particular field was teaching English, and he eventually became an academic at the Institute of Education, part of London University.
- Michael Rosen, (born 7 May 1946), son of Connie and Harold Rosen, is an English children's author, poet, presenter, political columnist, broadcaster, activist, and academic, who is a professor of children's literature in the Department of Educational Studies at Goldsmiths, University of London. He has written over 200 books for children and adults.
- Chanie Rosenberg (1922 –2021) South African-Lithuanian Jewish-born artist, author, journalist, radical pamphleteer, teacher and socialist; sister of Michael Kidron and partner of Tony Cliff, founder member of Socialist Workers Party in Britain.; relative of poet Isaac Rosenberg; studied Hebrew at Cape Town University; in 1944, moved to Palestine to live on kibbutz where she became an anti-Zionist and a revolutionary socialist and met Yigael Gluckstein (better known as Tony Cliff); moved to Britain where she was member of the Revolutionary Communist Party from 1944 to 1949; afterwards joining the group which eventually became the Socialist Workers Party; active in many anti-racist and anti-fascist mobilisations; active in the National Union of Teachers.; also artist whose sculpture has been exhibited in Royal Academy of Arts.
- Andrew Roth (23 April 1919 – 12 August 2010); biographer and journalist known for his compilation of Parliamentary Profiles, a directory of biographies of British Members of Parliament; compiled profiles of the personnel of the British Parliament and assessed their character traits, history, opinions and psychological drives; The Daily Telegraph called Roth a "Westminster institution". He continued updating this publication to 2010, and it with its research documents and notes, including about half a million press cuttings, is now archived at the Bishopsgate Institute.
- William Rothenstein (29 January 1872 – 14 February 1945), painter, printmaker, draughtsman, lecturer, writer on art; wrote several critical books and pamphlets, including Goya; the first English monograph on the artist), A Plea for a Wider Use of Artists & Craftsmen and Whither Painting; published three volumes of memoirs: Men and Memories, Vol I and II and Since Fifty. Men and Memories Volume I includes anecdotes about Oscar Wilde and many other friends of Rothenstein's, including Max Beerbohm, James Whistler, Paul Verlaine, Edgar Degas, and John Singer Sargent.
- Hannah Rothschild (born 22 May 1962), daughter of Jacob Rothschild, 4th Baron Rothschild, author, businesswoman, philanthropist and documentary filmmaker, has written screenplays and journalism, a biography and two novels; serves on charitable and financial boards and is first female to chair the Board of Trustees of the National Gallery in London;liaison trustee for the Tate Gallery;trustee of the Whitechapel Gallery;chair of Yad Hanadiv in Israel; directed films for Saturday Review, Arena and Omnibus; has written for The Times, The New York Times, The Observer, The Guardian, Daily Telegraph, Vanity Fair, Vogue, The Spectator and Harper's Bazaar, Financial Times, Elle, Washington Post and others.
- Bernice Rubens, novelist
- Miri Rubin (born 1956), historian and Professor of Medieval and Early Modern History at Queen Mary University of London and author of over ten scholarly academic texts and monographs on religion and the Middle Ages; educated at the Hebrew University of Jerusalem and the University of Cambridge; Rubin writes about social and religious history of Europe between 1100 and 1500, concentrating on interactions between public rituals, power, and community life.
- Oliver Sacks (9 July 1933 – 30 August 2015), neurologist, naturalist, historian of science, and writer of over twenty books, screenplays and scholarly articles, amongst them, 1973 book Awakenings, which was adapted into an Academy Award-nominated feature film in 1990, starring Robin Williams and Robert De Niro.
- Nina Salaman, (n15 July 1877 – 22 February 1925) was a British Jewish poet, translator, and social activist. Aside from her original poetry, she is best known for her English translations of medieval Hebrew verse—especially of the poems of Judah Halevi—which she began publishing at the age of 16.
- Maurice Samuel (1895 – 1972), author of the book You Gentiles, which is controversial for its portrayal of Jews and Gentiles as fundamentally distinct and incompatible civilisations. Samuel's depiction of enduring cultural and psychological differences between the two groups has been described by some critics as implying a form of Jewish supremacy and civilisational separatism.
- Raphael Samuel (26 December 1934 – 9 December 1996), Marxist; prolific author and historian of Hungarian Jewish ancestry, described by Stuart Hall as "one of the most outstanding, original intellectuals of his generation"; member of Communist Party Historians Group, alongside Christopher Hill, E.P. Thompson; founded the Partisan Coffee House in 1956 in Soho, London, as a meeting place for British New Left.
- Anne-Marie Sandler (December 15, 1925 – July 25, 2018), psychologist and psychoanalyst noted for her clinical observation of the relationship dynamic between blind infants and their mothers in a project spearheaded by Anna Freud. whilst majoring in psychology at the University of Geneva, was selected by Jean Piaget as research assistant in his project with UNESCO in Switzerland, which focused on the development of children's perception of homeland and foreignness; highly regarded for her scholarly work "Beyond Eight Months Anxiety," published in 1977, where she reconceptualised the stranger anxiety experienced by infants as a condition that is also present in her adult clients; president of the European Psychoanalytical Federation (EPF) and president of BPS in 1990; appeared on television discussion programme After Dark, alongside among others Clive Ponting, Colin Wallace, T. E. Utley and Peter Hain; held prominent positions in the Anna Freud Centre; also active in the International Psychoanalytical Association.
- Joseph J. Sandler (10 January 1927 – 6 October 1998), South African Jewish British psychoanalyst within the Anna Freud Grouping – now the Contemporary Freudians – of the British Psychoanalytical Society; perhaps best known for what has been called his 'silent revolution' in re-aligning the concepts of the object relations school within the framework of ego psychology; editor of the International Journal of Psycho-Analysis and President of the International Psychoanalytical Association; was the first Sigmund Freud Professor of Psychoanalysis at the Hebrew University of Jerusalem.
- Philippe Sands, KC (born 17 October 1960), writer, journalist and lawyer 11 King's Bench Walk; Director of the Centre on International Courts and Tribunals; counsel and advocate before many international courts and tribunals, including the International Court of Justice, the International Tribunal for the Law of the Sea, the European Court of Justice, the European Court of Human Rights and International Criminal Court;serves on panel of International Centre for the Settlement of Investment Disputes (CAS).; is author of seventeen books on international law as well as writing a number of geo-political texts; served as President of English PEN; appointed Professor of Law at Harvard Law School; co-founder of the Centre for International Environmental Law; and the Project on International Courts and Tribunals (1997); served as a Commissioner on the UK Government Commission on a Bill of Human Rights.
- Donald Sassoon (b. 1946 in Cairo), historian, academic, scholar, author of over fifteen books, essayist, Emeritus Professor of Comparative European History at Queen Mary, University of London .
- George Sassoon (30 October 1936 – 8 March 2006), British scientist, electronic engineer, linguist, translator and science fiction author of Iraqi Jewish Mizrahi Jewish origin; author of The Manna-Machine (1978) and The Kabbalah Decoded (1978).
- Siegfried Sassoon, writer and WW1 poet, of Iraqi Jewish Mizrahi Jewish origin.
- Charles Saatchi (Arabic: تشارلز ساعتجي; born 9 June 1943); author of numerous books, periodicals, journals and monographs on art and culture, Mizrahi Jewish Iraqi-Jewish British businessman and co-founder, with brother Maurice, of advertising agency Saatchi & Saatchi, the world's largest advertising agency; later formed a new agency called M&C Saatchi; also known for his art collection and for owning Saatchi Gallery, and for sponsorship of the Young British Artists (YBAs), including Damien Hirst and Tracey Emin.Successful campaigns included Silk Cut's advertisements and those for Conservative Party's 1979 general election victory – led by Margaret Thatcher through the slogan "Labour Isn't Working". Other clients included British Airways. In the Sunday Times Rich List 2009 ranking of the wealthiest people in the UK, was grouped with brother Maurice, with estimated fortune of £120 million.
- Alexei Sayle (born 7 August 1952), English actor, author, stand-up comedian, television presenter and former recording artist; voted the 18th greatest stand-up comic of all time on Channel 4's 100 Greatest Stand-Ups in 2007; In an updated 2010 poll he came 72nd. has written two short story collections, five novels, including a graphic novel and a radio series spin-off book, as well as columns for various publications; has written for Time Out and the Sunday Mirror; was one of eight contributory authors to the BBC Three competition End of Story.
- Simon Schama (born 13 February 1945), author of Lithuanian Jewish ancestry, specialising in art history, Dutch history, Jewish history, and French history. He is a University Professor of History and Art History at Columbia University, New York.
- Isaac Schapera FBA FRAI (23 June 1905 Garies, Cape Colony – 26 June 2003 London, England); of South African Jewish-Russian Jewish ancestry; author of numerous highly regarded anthropology books and over 200 monographs and scholarly academic papers on Africa;social anthropologist at London School of Economics specialising in South Africa; notable for his ethnographic and typological studies of the indigenous peoples of Botswana and South Africa; one of the founders of group that would develop British social anthropology, and students included important figures of anthropology, such as Ernest Gellner, Eileen Krige, Hilda Kuper, Max Gluckman, John Comaroff, Johan Frederik Holleman and Jean Comaroff.
- Melitta Schmideberg-Klein (née Klein; 17 January 1904 – 10 February 1983), author of numerous books, academic papers and monographs; physician, psychiatrist, and psychoanalyst; daughter of leading psychoanalyst Melanie Klein; associate member of British Psychoanalytical Society and underwent analysis with Edward Glover,
- Hanna Segal (1918–2011), psychoanalyst of Polish Jewish descent; follower of Melanie Klein; president of British Psychoanalytical Society, vice-president of International Psychoanalytical Association; was appointed to the Freud Memorial Chair at University College, London (UCL); considered the doyen of "classical" Kleinian thinking and technique" and "one of the most distinguished psychological theorists of our time "
- Judah Segal, FBA (21 June 1912 – 23 October 2003, prolific author, scholar and academic; Professor of Semitic Languages at the School of Oriental and African Studies.His father was Professor Moshe Zvi Segal, Israeli rabbi, linguist and Talmudic scholar; his brother was Labour Party politician Samuel Segal; father of University of London scholar, Professor Naomi Segal.
- Lynne Segal (born 29 March 1944) socialist feminist academic and activist; author of over ten books and numerous scholarly monographs on ideology and geopolitics; Professor of Psychology and Gender Studies at Birkbeck, University of London, where she now works in The School of Psychosocial Studies. Has written for The Guardian London Review of Books, Red Pepper (magazine), Novara Media, Radical Philosophy, and has worked with Jews for Justice for Palestinians, Independent Jewish Voices and Faculty for Israeli–Palestinian Peace (FFIPP) engaged in efforts to end the Israeli occupation of Palestinian land and create a just peace between Israel and Palestine.
- Anthony Seldon FRSA FRHistS FKC (born 2 August 1953); educator, contemporary historian, journalist, broadcaster, academic, author, wrote biographies of British Prime Ministers, John Major, Tony Blair, Gordon Brown, David Cameron, Theresa May and Boris Johnson; was master (headmaster) of Wellington College, one of Britain's co-educational independent boarding schools, and is current Head Master of Epsom College; is author or editor of more than 45 books on contemporary history, politics and education; was co-founder and first director of Centre for Contemporary British History; co-founder of Action for Happiness, is a governor of the Royal Shakespeare Company, and is on board of a number of charities and educational bodies; is honorary historical adviser to 10 Downing Street and member of the First World War Centenary Culture Committee; was knighted in the 2014 Birthday Honours for services to education and modern political history.
- Will Self, novelist (Jewish mother); son of Peter Self, and grandson of Sir Albert Henry Self
- Charles Gabriel Seligman FRS FRAI (né Seligmann; 24 December 1873 – 19 September 1940) was author, scholar, academic, physician and ethnologist; main ethnographic work described culture of Vedda people of Sri Lanka and Shilluk people of Sudan; was professor at London School of Economics; influential as the teacher of Bronisław Malinowski, E. E. Evans-Pritchard, and Meyer Fortes; was proponent of the Hamitic hypothesis, according to which some civilisations of Africa were thought to have been founded by Caucasoid Hamitic peoples. His work in the 1920s and 1930s is now seen as "white supremacist".
- Nicholas Serota (born 27 April 1946), author, art historian and curator; served as Director of the Tate from 1988 to 2017; currently Chair of Arts Council England; was previously Director of The Museum of Modern Art, Oxford, and Director of the Whitechapel Gallery, before becoming Director of the Tate; was also Chairman of the Turner Prize jury.
- Malcolm Shaw (academic) KC (born 1947), British legal academic, author, editor and lawyer; studied at University of Liverpool (LLB), Hebrew University of Jerusalem (LLM) and Keele University (PhD); was the Sir Robert Jennings Professor of International Law at the University of Leicester and taught international law, human rights and equity and trusts; appointed as Senior Fellow at Lauterpacht Centre for International Law at University of Cambridge; Trustee of the British Institute of International and Comparative Law. He is a practising barrister and jurist and teaches course on human rights at Hebrew University of Jerusalem; author of best selling book on International Law (first published in 1977; 6th edition released in 2008); also edited Title to Territory, a collection of articles on title and sovereignty in international law. His textbook is one of the key tomes used in introductory courses on international law. Shaw has appeared before the European Court of Human Rights, European Court of Justice, the UK Supreme Court, and the International Court of Justice (ICJ). Before the ICJ, he has represented countries such as the UAE, Serbia, and Cameroon. He has represented Azerbaijan, Ukraine, Ireland, and Malaysia in front of the other courts. In January 2024, he was on the four-person team representing Israel in the case brought by South Africa in the ICJ regarding accusations of genocidal acts by Israel in Gaza in the course of the Gaza war.
- Colin Shindler, first professor of Israel Studies in the UK; founding chairman of the European Association of Israeli Studies (EAIS); author of ten books including History Of Modern Israel(Cambridge University Press); main interests lie in evolution of Israeli Right, changes in the approach of the British and European Left towards Israel since 1948 and emigration movement of Soviet Jews between 1917 and 1991; Israel and the European Left: Between Solidarity and Delegitimisation (Continuum/Bloomsbury) was one of first books to examine history of relationship between the British Left and Israel; also wrote Vladimir Jabotinsky, Menahem Begin and Avraham Stern, The Rise of the Israeli Right: From Odesa to Hebron (Cambridge University Press) which was awarded gold medal in The Washington Institute's for Near East Policy's Book Prize competition; writes for the Jewish Chronicle, Jerusalem Post, Haaretz, History Today, Times Literary Supplement; author of over 650 articles and reviews on Israel and Jewish political history.
- Avi Shlaim, writer, of Iraqi Jewish and Mizrahi Jewish origin; his work focuses on Zionist settlement of the land of Palestine, history of the Nakba and dispossession of Palestinian land. He is one of Israel's New Historians, a group of Israeli scholars who put forward critical interpretations of the history of Zionism and Israel.
- David Shukman (born 30 May 1958), British journalist of Polish Jewish ancestry, author of over five books and the former science editor of BBC News; son of author and scholar Harold Shukman
- Nicola Shulman (born 1960), is a British biographer, former model, and aristocrat. After her marriage in 1990 she has been known as Nicola Phipps, Marchioness of Normanby. She is the author of two biographies. Her second book, Graven with Diamonds, was reviewed in The Daily Telegraph, The Guardian, The Times, The Sunday Times, and The Independent.
- J. David Simons, novelist
- Simon Sinek (born 9 October 1973), British-born American author and inspirational speaker of Hungarian Jewish ancestry; the author of five books, including Start With Why (2009) and The Infinite Game (2019).
- Robert Skidelsky, Baron Skidelsky (born 25 April 1939), of Russian Jewish ancestry, author of fifteen academic texts on economics and politics, focusing on, amongst others, fascist Oswald Mosley and he is the author of a three-volume award-winning biography of British economist John Maynard Keynes (1883–1946). Skidelsky also writes for The Guardian, The New York Times, Daily Mail, Financial Times.
- Daniel Snowman (born 1938), writer, historian, lecturer and broadcaster on social and cultural history. His career has spanned the academic world and the BBC, while his books include Kissing Cousins (a comparative study of British and American social attitudes); critical portraits of the Amadeus Quartet and of Plácido Domingo; a study of the cultural impact of The Hitler Émigrés; an anthology of essays about today's leading historians; The Gilded Stage: A Social History of Opera and Just Passing Through – Interactions with the World 1938 – 2021; born in London, his parents coming from Anglo-Jewish families with roots in 19th-century Eastern Europe.
- Flora Solomon, (née Benenson; 28 September 1895 – 18 July 1984) was an influential Zionist. The first woman hired to improve working conditions at Marks & Spencer in London, Solomon was later instrumental in the exposure of the spy Kim Philby. She was the mother of Peter Benenson, founder of Amnesty International and founder of Blackmore Press, a British printing house. Her life was described in her autobiography A Woman's Way, written in collaboration with Barnet Litvinoff and published in 1984 by Simon & Schuster. The work was also titled Baku to Baker Street: The Memoirs of Flora Solomon. Solomon campaigned for subsidised medical services, directly influencing the Labour concept of the welfare state and the creation of the British National Health Service in 1948
- Muriel Spark, novelist (Jewish father, possible Jewish mother; converted to Catholicism later in life)
- Bob Stanley (born Robert Andrew Shukman; 25 December 1964); musician, journalist, author, film producer; member of indie pop group Saint Etienne and music journalist for NME, Melody Maker, Mojo, The Guardian and The Times, as well as writing three books on music and football; also has a career as a DJ and as a producer of record labels, and has collaborated on a series of films about London. His second publication, Yeah! Yeah! Yeah!: The Story of Modern Pop, published by Faber & Faber; third publication Let's Do It: The Birth of Pop Music: A History, published by Pegasus.
- George Steiner, FBA (April 23, 1929 – February 3, 2020) author, literary critic, essayist, philosopher, novelist and educator; wrote about relationship between language, literature and society, as well as impact of the Holocaust; ranked "among the great minds in today's literary world"; was Professor University of Geneva (1974–94), Professor of Comparative Literature and Fellow in the University of Oxford (1994–95), Professor of Poetry in Harvard University (2001–02) and Fellow of Churchill College, Cambridge. Steiner believed that nationalism is too inherently violent to satisfy the moral prerogative of Judaism, having said "that because of what we are, there are things we can't do " and has suggested that Nazism was Europe's revenge on the Jews for inventing conscience; father of David Steiner (academic); executive director of the Johns Hopkins Institute for Education Policy; appointed to the Practitioner Council at the Hoover Institute, Stanford University.
- Hillel Steiner (born 1942) is a prolific author, scholar, academic, editor and political philosopher and is Emeritus Professor of Political Philosophy at the University of Manchester; signatory to the Euston Manifesto and elected to the Fellowship of the British Academy in 1999. He is a member of the following organisations: American Philosophical Association, Aristotelian Society, International Association for the Philosophy of Law and Social Philosophy, Basic Income Earth Network. British Philosophical Association, European Society for the History of Economic Thought, Political Studies Association, Society for Applied Philosophy, and the September Group.
- Jack Straw (born 3 August 1946), Christian, of Eastern European Jewish ancestry; served in Cabinet under Labour governments of Tony Blair and Gordon Brown as Home Secretary and Foreign Secretary; has written for The Guardian, Daily Mail, El País, The Independent, The Mirror UK, The Sun, The Telegraph, Financial Times, The Times, POLITICO, LSE Connect, Prospect Magazine, The New European and is author or co-author of the following books; The English Job: Understanding Iran and Why It Distrusts Britain (2019) ISBN 978-1785903991; Implementation of the Human Rights Act 1998: Minutes of Evidence, Wednesday 14 March 2001 (2001) ISBN 0-10-442701-9; Making Prisons Work: Prison Reform Trust Annual Lecture (1998) ISBN 0-946209-44-8; Future of Policing and Criminal Justice (Institute of Police & Criminological Studies Occasional Paper S.) (1996) ISBN 1-86137-087-3 and Policy and Ideology (1993) ISBN 0-9521163-0-8
- John Strawson, author of Encountering Islamic law, Partitioning Palestine: Legal Fundamentalism in the Palestinian-Israeli Conflict and editor of Law after Ground Zero and Tracking the Postcolonial in Law; also law professor at the University of East London School of Law, teaching International law and Middle East Studies; specialises in law and postcolonialism, with particular reference to middle east, Islam and international law; previous posts include visiting positions at Birzeit University (Palestine) and the Institute of Social Studies (The Hague Netherlands); researches encounter between western and Islamic law; is Director of Law Postgraduate Programmes at University of East London, and Director of the Centre on Human Rights in Conflict; believes use of term apartheid to describe Israel or Israeli policies does not apply to Israel, and use of analogy is unhistorical, and unhelpful.
- Jamie Susskind (b. 1989); barrister and author of Oxford University Press books on Marxism, freedoms, democracy and technology; was appointed as a research fellow at Harvard's Berkman Klein Center for Internet and Society; practises law at Littleton Chambers; his book Future Politics: Living Together in a World Transformed by Tech, listed by London School of Economics as one of top ten books of 2019; book approaches issues of technological change in political arena from legal standpoint, speculating on various ways technology would change interactions between citizens and political process; was awarded Book of the Year by Evening Standard and Prospect Magazine, Book of the Day by The Guardian and received the 2019 Estoril Global Issues Distinguished Book Prize; his book, The Digital Republic: On Freedom and Democracy in the 21st Century concerns dangers, problems, and solutions to Big Tech.
- Richard Susskind OBE FRSE (born 28 March 1961); author, speaker, independent adviser to international professional firms and national governments; IT adviser to Lord Chief Justice of England and Wales, holds professorships at the University of Oxford, Gresham College and Strathclyde University, is a past chair of Advisory Panel on Public Sector Information, and is president of the Society for Computers and Law; has authored nine books and is regular columnist at The Times.
- Adam Sutcliffe; Professor of European History at King's College London, journalist writing on Jewish history and identity for Times Literary Supplement, author of What Are Jews For: History, Peoplehood, and Purpose (Princeton University Press, 2020), Judaism and Enlightenment; coeditor of Philosemitism in History, The Cambridge History of Judaism: The Early Modern World, and History, Memory and Public Life: The Past in the Present.
- William Sutcliffe, novelist; New Boy (1986), Are You Experienced? (1997), Whatever Makes You Happy (2008), and The Wall (2013), set in an Israeli colony
- David Sylvester (21 September 1924 – 19 June 2001), prolific author, art critic, journalist and curator; trustee of the Tate Gallery; influential in promoting modern artists Francis Bacon, Joan Miró, and Lucian Freud; father of modern artist Cecily Brown; credited with coining the term Kitchen sink realism originally to describe a strand of post-war British painting.
- Mitchell Symons, writer
- Henri Tajfel (born Hersz Mordche; 22 June 1919 – 3 May 1982) was a Polish Jewish social psychologist and author, best known for his books and pioneering work on the cognitive aspects of prejudice and social identity theory, as well as being one of the founders of the European Association of Experimental Social Psychology. He also worked for the United Nations International Refugee Organization.
- Adam Thirlwell, FRSL (born 22 August 1978) is a British novelist. His work has been translated into thirty languages. He has twice been named as one of Granta's Best of Young British Novelists. In 2015 he received the E.M. Forster Award from the American Academy of Arts and Letters. He is an advisory editor of The Paris Review.
- Barbara Trapido (born 1941 as Barbara Schuddeboom), is a British novelist born in South Africa with German, Danish and Dutch ancestry. Born in Cape Town and growing up in Durban she studied at the University of Natal gaining a BA in 1963 before emigrating to London. After many years teaching, she became a full-time writer in 1970.
- Michael Tugendhat (born 21 October 1944),; retired High Court judge; was High Court's senior media judge; author and editor of The Law of Privacy and the Media Oxford University Press; Commercial Fraud: Civil Liability, Human Rights, and Money Laundering Oxford University Press; Les droits du genre humain : la liberté en France et en Angleterre (1159–1793), [The rights of mankind : liberty in France and England (1159–1793)] (with Elizabeth de Montlaur Martin, 2021), ISBN 978-2-36517-110-6, Société de Législation comparée, Paris (awarded by the French Académie des sciences morales et politiques the Prix Édouard Bonnefous 2022); Liberty Intact: Human Rights in English Law (2016) Oxford University Press and Fighting for Freedom? (2017), ISBN 978-1-911128-49-6, Bright Blue (organisation)
- Jackie Walker (activist), anti Zionist playwright, pro-Palestinian, anti fascist author, of Sephardi Jewish and Jamaican origin.
- Arthur Waley (1889–1966); orientalist and sinologist of Ashkenazi ancestry; renowned for his translations of Chinese and Japanese poetry; awarded the CBE in 1952, the Queen's Gold Medal for Poetry; invested as a Companion of Honour in 1956.
- Natasha Walter (born 20 January 1967), feminist writer, novelist, human rights activist, founder of charity Women for Refugee Women; father was Nicolas Walter, an anarchist and secular humanist writer; of German Jewish ancestry; journalist forVogue magazine; Deputy Literary Editor of The Independent; columnist and feature writer for The Guardian; appear regularly on BBC2's Newsnight Review and Radio 4's Front Row; was judge on the Booker Prize and was a judge on the Women's Prize for Fiction (formerly the Orange Prize); was the founder in 2006 of the charity Women for Refugee Women, where she was the director until 2021. The charity supports women who seek asylum to tell their stories and challenges injustices they experience. She was recognized as one of the BBC's 100 women of 2013.
- Nicolas Walter (22 November 1934 – 7 March 2000) was a British anarchist and atheist writer, speaker and activist. He was a member of the Committee of 100 and Spies for Peace, and wrote on topics of anarchism and humanism.
- Fredric Warburg (27 November 1898 – 25 May 1981), author, publicist, publisher best known for association with George Orwell. Besides his own work as an author, he promoted and published Franz Kafka. Other notable publications included The Third Eye by Lobsang Rampa, Adolf Hitler's Mein Kampf and William Shirer's The Rise and Fall of the Third Reich.
- Ruby Wax (née Wachs; born 19 April 1953) is an American-British actress, author of popular self-help books, comedian, television personality, and popular mental health campaigner, of Austrian Jewish descent; appointed Chancellor of the University of Southampton; Wax also teaches business communication in the public and private sectors. Clients include Deutsche Bank, the UK Home Office and Skype.
- Eyal Weizman (born 1970) is a British Israeli architect and author of over twenty books and academic papers, mostly on the Israeli occupation of Palestinian land and the architecture of the wall around Gaza. He is the director of the research agency Forensic Architecture at Goldsmiths, University of London where he is Professor of Spatial and Visual Cultures and a founding director there of the Centre for Research Architecture at the department of Visual Cultures. In 2019 he was elected Fellow of the British Academy.
- Rosie Whitehouse, journalist and author. Wife of Tim Judah and mother of Ben Judah; of Iraqi Jewish ancestry. Her historical research and profiles of Holocaust Survivors have been published by The Observer, The Jewish Chronicle, BBC News and Tablet magazine. Meanwhile, her writing about British government policy toward victims after the Holocaust and contemporary British antisemitism has appeared in The Independent and Haaretz.
- Stephen Winsten, (1893–1991) was the name adopted by Samuel Weinstein, one of the 'Whitechapel Boys' group of young Jewish men and future writers in London's East End in the years before World War I (the others included Isaac Rosenberg, John Rodker and Joseph Leftwich). In the First World War he was a conscientious objector, and imprisoned in Bedford and Reading gaols. He is now known for his works about George Bernard Shaw, and his writing on the life of Henry Salt.
- Robert Winston, Baron Winston (born 15 July 1940), British professor, author, journalist, medical doctor, scientist, television presenter and Labour Party politician.He is a member of Labour Friends of Israel; father of Ben Winston, renowned for producing a number of the annual Brit Awards from 2011 to 2014 and more recently he was a co-producer of US Grammy Awards and Tony Awards.
- Ludwig Wittgenstein (26 April 1889 – 29 April 1951) was an Austrian-Jewish British philosopher who worked primarily in logic, the philosophy of mathematics, the philosophy of mind, and the philosophy of language. He is considered by some to be the greatest philosopher of the 20th century.
- Richard Wollheim (5 May 1923 − 4 November 2003), prolific author noted for work on mind and emotions related to visual arts, specifically, painting; served as president of the British Society of Aesthetics; was Grote Professor of Mind and Logic, professor at Columbia University and University of California at Berkeley and lecturer at Balliol College, Harvard University, the University of Minnesota, Graduate Center, CUNY, the University of California at Davis; gave Andrew M. Mellon lectures in Fine Arts, National Gallery of Art, Washington; his book Art and its Objects considered one of the twentieth century's most influential texts on philosophical aesthetics; known for philosophical treatments of depth psychology, especially Sigmund Freud's
- Jonathan Wolff FBA (born 1959) author of seven Oxford University Press academic books and numerous monographs and journals, philosopher and scholar; Professor of Values and Public Policy at the Blavatnik School of Government at the University of Oxford; Governing Body Fellow at Wolfson College; previously at University College London (UCL), where he was Professor of Philosophy and Dean of the Faculty of Arts and Humanities; was secretary of the British Philosophical Association and has been Editor and honorary secretary of the Aristotelian Society; presented a four-part series about the UK's National Health Service (NHS) for the BBC's Radio 3; was member of the Nuffield Council on Bioethics; was elected Fellow of the British Academy in 2023.
- Leonard Woolf, writer and activist
- Bat Ye'or (born 1933), best known for creating and popularising Eurabia conspiracy theory in her writings about modern Europe.
- Tamar Yellin (b. 1963), author whose first novel, The Genizah at the House of Shepher, won Sami Rohr Prize for Jewish Literature; granddaughter of Yitzhak Yaakov Yellin (1885–1964), pioneer of Hebrew language press in Palestine;
- Jane Yolen (February 11, 1939) is an American writer of fantasy and part-time resident in the UK, science fiction, and children's books. She is the author or editor of more than 400 books, of which the best known is The Devil's Arithmetic, a Holocaust novella
- Israel Zangwill (1864–1926), novelist and playwright. Zangwill was a British author at the forefront of cultural Zionism during the 19th century, and was associate of Theodor Herzl, later rejecting search for a Jewish homeland in Palestine. Father of Oliver Zangwill and husband of Suffragette Edith Ayrton.
- Theodore Zeldin, writer

== Poets ==
- Dannie Abse, poet and physician
- Al Alvarez, poet
- Marc Bolan (born Mark Feld; 30 September 1947 – 16 September 1977); guitarist, singer, songwriter and poet; in 1969, wrote a collection of poems entitled The Warlock of Love; of Russian Jewish and Polish Jewish ancestry, Bolan was pioneer of glam rock movement in early 1970s with T. Rex; was inducted into the Rock and Roll Hall of Fame in 2020.
- Ivor Cutler, poet, humorist, musician
- Aviva Dautch, poet
- Elaine Feinstein, poet, writer, biographer
- Rose Fyleman, children's writer
- Karen Gershon, German-born poet
- Yvonne Green, (8 April 1957 – 16 April 2024) was an English poet, translator, writer and barrister. She was an Orthodox Jew, of Bukharian Jewish ancestry. Her first pamphlet, Boukhara, was published in 2007 and won The Poetry Business 2007 Book & Pamphlet Competition. Her first full-length collection, The Assay was published in 2010 and as a result of an award from Celia Atkin and Lord Gavron was translated into Hebrew in 2013, under the title HaNisuyi and published in Israel by Am Oved.
- Philip Hobsbaum, poet
- Jenny Joseph, poet
- Denise Levertov (1923-1997), British-born, naturalised American poet, feminist and anti-war activist.
- Amy Levy, poet and novelist
- Mina Loy (1882–1966); of Hungarian Jewish ancestry; artist, writer, poet, playwright, novelist, painter, designer, and bohemian; first-generation modernist; her poetry admired by T. S. Eliot, Ezra Pound, William Carlos Williams, Basil Bunting, Gertrude Stein, Francis Picabia, Yvor Winters; was daughter of Hungarian Jewish tailor, Sigmund Felix Lowy, who had moved to London to evade persistent antisemitism in Budapest, and Christian, English mother.
- Michael Hamburger OBE poet and translator
- Anna Mendelssohn (born Anna Mendleson, 1948 – 15 November 2009), who wrote under the name Grace Lake, was prolific writer, poet, artist and political activist with The Angry Brigade; was inspired by the Paris student risings in May 1968, and became political radical in Britain; later studied poetry at St Edmund's College, Cambridge, devoting her life to poetry and art; became opposed to technology, disliking judgments based on rationality in favour of those based on artistic judgment.
- Vivian de Sola Pinto, poet
- John Rodker, poet and publisher
- Isaac Rosenberg, war poet
- Leon Rosselson, radical singer, songwriter and children's book author.
- Siegfried Sassoon, writer and WW1 poet, of Iraqi Jewish Mizrahi Jewish origin.
- Henry Shukman (born 1962 in Oxford, Oxfordshire); poet and writer; father was historian Harold Shukman; brother is BBC News reporter David Shukman.
- Jon Silkin, poet
- Stephen Spender (28 February 1909 – 16 July 1995); poet, novelist and essayist whose work concentrated on themes of social injustice and the class struggle; son of Harold Spender (22 June 1864 – 15 April 1926), Liberal Party politician, author, journalist and lecturer of German Jewish ancestry.
- George Szirtes (born 29 November 1948); poet and translator; opposes Boycott, Divestment and Sanctions movement and was a signatory to the Euston Manifesto; was judge for the 2017 Griffin Poetry Prize; has won a variety of prizes for his work, most recently the 2004 T. S. Eliot Prize, for his collection Reel, and the Bess Hokin Prize in 2008 for poems in Poetry magazine. His translations from Hungarian poetry, fiction and drama have also won numerous awards; has received an Honorary Fellowship from Goldsmiths College, University of London
- Arthur Waley (born Arthur David Schloss, 19 August 1889 – 27 June 1966); produced works on Theravada Tripiṭaka Sutta Piṭaka and Abhidhamma Piṭaka texts, as well as developing translations of works by Chuang Tzu, Lao Tzu, and writing his own perspectives and contemplations on the key Mahayana wisdom scriptures. Amongst his honours were the CBE in 1952, the Queen's Gold Medal for Poetry in 1953, and he was invested as a Companion of Honour in 1956.
- Humbert Wolfe, poet and civil servant

== Playwrights ==
- Peter Barnes, playwright
- Steven Berkoff, playwright, actor, author, and theatre director
- Ashley Blaker, comedian and television producer; writer for TV and radio and longtime collaborator with Matt Lucas: was producer of Little Britain and Rock Profile. Lucas described Blaker as "the UK's only Orthodox comedian". Blaker's Off-Broadway show, Strictly Unorthodox, opened in 2017 at The Theater Center. and his second Off-Broadway show, Goy Friendly opened in February 2020, at SoHo Playhouse.
- Ben Elton (born 3 May 1959) comedian, actor, author, playwright, lyricist and director; was a part of London's alternative comedy movement of the 1980s and writer on the sitcoms The Young Ones and Blackadder, as well as stand-up comedian on stage and television; style in the 1980s was left-wing political satire; Elton is cousin of singer Olivia Newton-John; Elton's father is from a German-Jewish family and Elton's mother, who was raised in the Church of England, is of English background; has published 17 novels and written numerous rock operas and musicals.
- Ronald Harwood (né Horwitz; 9 November 1934 – 8 September 2020) was a South African Jewish -born British author, playwright, and screenwriter, best known for his plays for the British stage as well as the screenplays for The Dresser (for which he was nominated for an Oscar) and The Pianist, for which he won the 2003 Academy Award for Best Adapted Screenplay. He was nominated for the Best Adapted Screenplay Oscar for The Diving Bell and the Butterfly (2007); cousin of Antony Sher.
- Tom Kempinski, playwright and screenwriter
- Peter Kosminsky (born 21 April 1956); writer, playwright, scriptwriter and screenwriter director and producer; has directed Hollywood movies White Oleander and television films, Warriors, The Government Inspector, The Promise, Wolf Hall and The State; born in London in 1956 to Jewish parents.
- Hyam Maccoby (Hebrew: חיים מכובי, 1924–2004) was a Jewish-British scholar, dramatist, playwright and author of over fifteen scholarly books, specialising in the study of the Jewish and Christian religious traditions. He was known for his theories of the historical Jesus and the origins of Christianity. Maccoby's play The Disputation has been widely performed, and was broadcast by Channel 4 starring Christopher Lee and Toyah Willcox. Hyam Maccoby's daughter is the anti-Zionist BDS activist, organiser of Jews for Justice for Palestinians and author, Deborah Maccoby, acknowledged for her monograph on Isaac Rosenberg.
- Patrick Marber, playwright and comedian
- Laurence Marks (British writer) (born 8 December 1948), producer, scriptwriter, screenwriter and one half of writing duo Marks and Gran (with Maurice Gran).
- Harold Pinter, Nobel prize-winning playwright; Pinter signed the mission statement of Jews for Justice for Palestinians in 2005 and its full-page advertisement, "What Is Israel Doing? A Call by Jews in Britain", published in The Times on 6 July 2006, and he was a patron of the Palestine Festival of Literature. In April 2008, Pinter signed the statement "We're not celebrating Israel's anniversary". The statement noted: "We cannot celebrate the birthday of a state founded on terrorism, massacres and the dispossession of another people from their land.", "We will celebrate when Arab and Jew live as equals in a peaceful Middle East"
- Jack Rosenthal (8 September 1931 – 29 May 2004) was an English playwright. He wrote 129 early episodes of the ITV soap opera Coronation Street and over 150 screenplays, including original TV plays, feature films, and adaptations.
- Jolyon Rubinstein (born 22 April 1981), actor, writer, producer, scriptwriter, journalist, op-ed columnist and director; best known for scriptwriting and performing in The Revolution Will Be Televised, a show on BBC Three, alongside Heydon Prowse; Rubinstein's first professional acting job was that of the PR in the TV series Nathan Barley; co-wrote script and acted in BBC Three television show The Revolution Will Be Televised; also wrote for the Financial Times Business and Yahoo In 2018, he co-created the ITV2 hip hop comedy show Don't Hate the Playaz. In 2020, Rubinstein launched the satire news show Not The News with Jolyon Rubinstein
- David Seidler (born 1937) playwright and film and television writer. best known for writing the scripts for the stage version and screen version for the story The King's Speech for which he won the Academy Award and a BAFTA for Best Original Screenplay; son of Doris Seidler (1912–2010), painter, printmaker and graphic artist.
- Peter and Anthony Shaffer, playwrights
- Gary Sinyor (born Manchester, England, 1962), film director, playwright, producer, and writer. His first play NotMoses opened in London's West End; wrote, directed and produced a psychological thriller The Unseen; has also written for The Jewish Chronicle, Jewish News, Times of Israel and The Guardian.
- Gillian Slovo (born 15 March 1952); South African Jewish playwright, novelist and author who lives in the UK; recipient of Golden PEN Award; moved to London in 1964, as political exile. Her family is Jewish.
- Tom Stoppard OM CBE FRSL HonFBA (born Tomáš Sträussler, 3 July 1937); playwright, screenwriter; has written for film, radio, stage, and television, finding prominence with plays; work covers themes of human rights, censorship, and political freedom, philosophical thematics of society; has been a playwright of National Theatre and is one of the most internationally performed dramatists of his generation; was knighted for his contribution to theatre by Queen Elizabeth II.
- Alfred Sutro, OBE (7 August 1863 – 11 September 1933) was an English dramatist, writer and translator. In addition to a succession of successful plays of his own in the first quarter of the 20th century, Sutro made the first English translations of works by the Belgian writer Maurice Maeterlinck.
- Jackie Walker (activist), anti Zionist anti fascist playwright and pro Palestinian author of Sephardi Jewish and Jamaican origin.
- Arnold Wesker, playwright, FRSL (24 May 1932 – 12 April 2016) was an English dramatist. He was the author of 50 plays, four volumes of short stories, two volumes of essays, much journalism and a book on the subject, a children's book, some poetry, and other assorted writings. His plays have been translated into 20 languages, and performed worldwide.

== Journalists ==
- David Aaronovitch, English journalist, television presenter and author. He is the author of Paddling to Jerusalem: An Aquatic Tour of Our Small Country (2000), Voodoo Histories: the role of Conspiracy Theory in Modern History (2009) and Party Animals: My Family and Other Communists (2016). He won the Orwell Prize for political journalism in 2001, and the What the Papers Say "Columnist of the Year" award in 2003. He previously wrote for The Independent, The Guardian and The Times.
- Barbara Amiel; a British-Canadian conservative journalist, writer, and socialite.
- Ian Austin, Baron Austin of Dudley (born 6 March 1965), journalist for The Daily Mail, the Daily Telegraph, The Guardian and Jewish Chronicle; life peer in House of Lords; was Member of Parliament (MP); was political advisor to Chancellor of the Exchequer (later Prime Minister), Gordon Brown; was Assistant Whip for the Government; was member of Labour Friends of Israel.
- Antony Barnett investigative journalist; has worked as a reporter and presenter for Channel 4's Dispatches, The Observer where he held a number of posts including as the newspaper's Investigations Editor; Barnett's undercover investigation "The Battle for the Labour Party" won British Journalism Award for political journalism; co-founder of openDemocracy and has written for Jewish Chronicle, The Guardian HuffPost UK, New York Review of Books, Common Dreams, New Statesman, The Lancet, Prospect Magazine, The Bureau of Investigative Journalism, LabourList, Eurozine, Byline Times.
- Emma Barnett (born 5 February 1985); broadcaster and journalist for The Jewish Chronicle; main presenter of Woman's Hour on BBC Radio 4 since January 2021, and subsequently for the BBC Radio Four Today programme.
- Mir Basri, (Arabic: مير بصري; 1911-2006) was an Iraqi writer, economist, journalist, politician and poet. Among many public positions he held, Basri served as the head and central leader of Iraqi and Baghdad's Jewish community; joined the Iraqi Foreign Ministry, going on to hold a number of government positions including many relating to Iraq's Jewish community. He held many positions in Iraq, including: secretary of the advisory committee and supervisor of supply affairs, director general and secretary at the Iraqi Ministry of Foreign Affairs, undersecretary and director of protocol therein, and president of the Baghdad Chamber of Commerce. He also attended many international conferences representing Iraq. Basri also held the position of honorary president of the Jewish Community in Iraq during the late sixties and early seventies, and was economics columnist for the newspapers Al-Ikhwa Al-Watani, Al-Bilad, and Al-Shaab, and edited the weekly newspaper Al-Daleel.
- Rachel Beer, editor-in-chief of The Observer and The Sunday Times, born in Bombay to Sassoon David Sassoon, of the Iraqi Sassoon family.
- Rafael Behr (born June 1974), of South African Jewish ancestry; columnist at The Guardian, Financial Times; Jewish Chronicle; former political editor of the New Statesman. Behr was named political commentator of the year at the 2014 Comment Awards; in 2019, he was shortlisted for same award again. Before becoming a journalist, Behr worked as a political risk analyst reporting on countries of the former Soviet Union.Since 2020 he has presented Politics on the Couch, an occasional podcast about the psychology of politics.
- Daniel Ben-Ami, journalist and author; has written on economic development, the world economy, financial markets and investment funds; has also used pseudonym Daniel Nassim. His work has appeared in Jewish Chronicle, Financial Times, The Guardian, The Independent, Prospect, The Sunday Telegraph and The Sunday Times and in the successor to Living Marxism, Spiked.
- Roger Bennett (journalist) (born 14 September 1970); journalist for Tablet (magazine) broadcaster, podcaster, and filmmaker; co-hosts Men in Blazers podcast and television show alongside Michael Davies; author Reborn in the USA: An Englishman's Love Letter to his Chosen Home; married to Vanessa Kroll, daughter of Kroll Inc. founder Jules Kroll; his brother-in-law is comedian Nick Kroll. Bennett is Jewish.
- Chaim Bermant (1929–1998), journalist and novelist.
- Raffi Berg is the Middle East editor of the BBC News website; graduated in modern and medieval history from the London School of Economics; was student of Jewish and Israel studies at the Hebrew University of Jerusalem; author of Red Sea Spies: The True Story of Mossad's Fake Diving Resort (Icon Books, 2020)
- Lionel Blue, rabbi and journalist
- Amber de Botton, head of UK news at ITV News; was previously head of politics at ITV and deputy head of politics at Sky News, after starting career as a parliamentary reporter; currently Prime Minister Rishi Sunak's director of communications.
- Julian Borger; journalist and non-fiction writer; world affairs editor at The Guardian. He was a correspondent in the United States, Eastern Europe, the Middle East and the Balkans and covered the Bosnian War for the BBC. Borger is a contributor to the Center on International Cooperation, a foreign policy think tank based at New York University that works to enhance multilateral responses to global problems, including conflict, humanitarian crises, and recovery; international security challenges, including weapons proliferation and the changing balance of power; resource scarcity and climate change.
- Martin Bright (born 5 June 1966); worked for the BBC World Service and The Guardian; political editor of New Statesman, The Spectator, The Jewish Chronicle's political editor and worked at Tony Blair Faith Foundation; has closely monitored rise of Muslim extremism, terrorist attacks in Britain and abroad, and aspects of British governmental relations with Muslim community in the United Kingdom; founded New Deal of the Mind, a charitable company to promote employment in creative fields and working with organisations, government and all political parties. In 2001, wrote "The Great Koran Con Trick" in the New Statesman and in Channel Four documentary, Who Speaks for Muslims? (2002), and When Progressives Treat with Reactionaries: The British State's flirtation with radical Islamism (2006), a report for the Policy Exchange, Bright examined issues of contemporary Muslim community in the United Kingdom.
- Tom Brook (born 16 June 1953); broadcaster and journalist working primarily for BBC News, BBC World News, BBC News Channel and Talking Movies. Brook's parents were Caspar Brook, the first director of the Consumers' Association in Britain, and Dinah, journalist for The Observer.
- Tina Brown, Christina Hambley Brown, Lady Evans (born 21 November 1953), is an English journalist, magazine editor, columnist, talk-show host, and author of The Diana Chronicles (2007) a biography of Diana, Princess of Wales, The Vanity Fair Diaries (2017) and The Palace Papers (2022). Born a British citizen of an Iraqi Jewish German Jewish mother and British father, she now holds joint citizenship after she took United States citizenship in 2005, following her emigration in 1984 to edit Vanity Fair.
- Alex Brummer (born 25 May 1949); author of eight books; writes for Jewish News, Times of Israel, city editor of the Daily Mail; financial editor of The Guardian; regular contributor to The Jewish Chronicle writing on business, media, the Holocaust, Middle East policy; also writes "The Money" article for the New Statesman; member of editorial board of Jewish Renaissance magazine; Vice-president of the Board of Deputies of British Jews; covered the 1980, 1984, and 1988 US presidential elections for The Guardian and won the 1989 Overseas Press Club award for best foreign correspondent in the US; worked as editor for the Financial Mail on Sunday; voted Financial Journalist of the Year at the British Press Awards; covered the 2003 Iraq War for the Daily Mail from Washington, D.C.; led the newspaper's coverage on the 2007 run on Northern Rock, collapse of Lehman Brothers, and subsequent credit crunch. In 2009, Brummer appeared as witness at House of Commons Treasury Select Committee to answer questions on role of media in financial stability and "whether financial journalists should operate under any form of reporting restrictions during banking crises".
- Ian Buruma, author and journalist; board member of Human Rights in China; fellow of European Council of Foreign Relations; journalist for The New York Review of Books and has written for The Guardian; held fellowships at Wissenschaftskolleg and at Woodrow Wilson International Center for Scholars in Washington, D.C.; was Alistair Horne fellow of St Antony's College in Oxford.
- Stephen Bush; ( b. 1990) columnist and associate editor at the Financial Times; has written for The Guardian, The Daily Telegraph, The Jewish Chronicle, Jewish News, Times of Israel, The i Paper and New Statesman; runner-up in the Young Journalist of the Year awards category in Press Awards; was awarded Political Studies Association's Journalist of the Year award;was appointed to chair the Board of Deputies of British Jews' Commission on Racial Inclusivity in the Jewish Community.
- Barbara Charone author of authorised biography of Keith Richards; board member of Chelsea F.C.; journalist and music critic for the NME, Rolling Stone, Sounds magazine and Creem; public relations and press director at WEA; founded the agency MBC PR where clients include Madonna, Depeche Mode, Primal Scream, Robert Plant, Pearl Jam, Rod Stewart and Christina Aguilera as well as comedians David Walliams, Graham Norton and Russell Brand; won the Music Week Press Award in 2006 and 2009; The Guardian included her on list of "The 20 most powerful celebrity makers" as "Britain's most powerful music PR", citing her reviving of careers of Madonna and Neil Diamond and establishing Duffy and Mark Ronson. Charone is on Chelsea F.C. Board of directors.
- Jo Coburn (born 12 November 1967); broadcaster and journalist with BBC News, married to former Downing Street head of strategic communications Mark Flanagan; regular presenter of Politics Live (and formerly also Sunday Politics along with Andrew Neil) and previously had special responsibility for BBC Breakfast; former BBC political correspondent for London, who covered the 2000 London Mayoral election; occasional relief presenter on the BBC News Channel. She has presented on BBC Radio 4 in the past and also has guested on the weekend current affairs programme The World This Weekend as well as reviewing the Sunday newspapers on The Andrew Marr Show.
- Benjamin Cohen (journalist) (born 14 August 1982), web developer, entrepreneur and online publisher; founder of LGBT news site PinkNews;from 2006 until 2012 was technology correspondent for Channel 4 News. He is the Chief Executive of PinkNews, and regularly writes for the London Evening Standard.
- Dave Cohen (writer); writer for television and radio as well as contributing columns to NME, Chortle and The Huffington Post.; has written for BBC Radio 4 including The Best of British, Dead Ringers which won a Sony Gold Award 2001, The Sunday Format, The News Quiz and 15 Minute Musical which he was also a co-creator and won the 2009 Writer's Guild Best Radio Comedy Show, to name a few. He also wrote for BBC Radio 5's The Treatment and They Came From Nowhere; has written for Rory Bremner Show, Spitting Image, Eleven O'Clock Show, Not Going Out and My Family. He has been a long time writer for Have I Got News For You and Horrible Histories which has won a variety of awards including Best Sketch Show, Best Comedy Show at the Children's BAFTAs and Best British Comedy Show.
- Nick Cohen, Neoconservatism and New Labour, hawkish pro Zionist journalist; in 2006, he was a leading signatory to the Euston Manifesto
- Giles Coren (born 29 July 1969), columnist, food writer, television and radio presenter; restaurant critic for The Times and The Jewish Chronicle; named Food and Drink Writer of the Year at the British Press Awards in 2005; son of Alan Coren; elder brother of journalist Victoria Coren Mitchell; also related to the Canadian journalist Michael Coren.
- Rachel Cunliffe, associate political editor at The New Statesman; daughter of Sir Jon Cunliffe, who served as Deputy Governor of the Bank of England for Financial Stability, and who was appointed to the UK Holocaust Memorial Foundation.
- Theodore Dalrymple (b. 1949), right wing conservative cultural critic; contributing editor to City Journal, published by Manhattan Institute, where he is the Dietrich Weismann Fellow; his work has appeared in The British Medical Journal, The Times, New Statesman, The Observer, The Daily Telegraph, The Spectator, The Salisbury Review, National Review, New English Review, The Wall Street Journal and Axess magasin; author of Life at the Bottom: The Worldview That Makes the Underclass, Our Culture, What's Left of It and Spoilt Rotten: The Toxic Cult of Sentimentality; his writing argues that leftist views prevalent within Western intellectual circles minimise responsibility of individuals for their own actions and undermine traditional mores, contributing to the formation within prosperous countries of an underclass afflicted by endemic violence, criminality, sexually transmitted diseases, welfare dependency, and drug abuse. Dalrymple was awarded Prize for Liberty by the Flemish classical-liberal think-tank Libera!.
- John Diamond, journalist
- Alf Dubs, Baron Dubs (b. 1932) journalist-op-ed column writer for The Guardian, New Statesman, Financial Times, Time; Labour Party politician and former Member of Parliament; appointed Labour life peer with the title of Baron Dubs, of Battersea in the London Borough of Wandsworth; was chair of Broadcasting Standards Commission (Ofcom) and deputy chair of Independent Television Commission; chair of Liberty, trustee of Action Aid, trustee of the Immigration Advisory Service; vice president of Fabian Society; patron of Humanists UK, a patron of Refugee Support Group; treasurer of the All-Party Parliamentary Humanist Group.
- Matthew Engel (born 11 June 1951); writer, author of over ten books, editor, journalist for The Jewish Chronicle, The Guardian, Daily Mail, The Independent, The Telegraph, 1843, Financial Times, New Statesman, The Times Literary Supplement; of Polish Jewish ancestry.
- Richard Ferrer; journalist and editor of Jewish News; sub-editor at the Daily Mirror; written for the Daily Telegraph, The Times, Algemeiner, The Times of Israel and the Independent; regular contributor to programmes on BBC Radio 4.
- Lord Baron Daniel Finkelstein,(born 30 August 1962); journalist and politician; writes for Jewish Chronicle; former executive editor of The Times.; former chairman of Policy Exchange; chair of the think tank Onward; made a member of the House of Lords in August 2013, sitting as a Conservative.
- Lance Forman (born October 1962); politician and businessman, who was a Member of the European Parliament (MEP) for London between 2 July 2019 and the United Kingdom's withdrawal from the EU; affiliated with Conservative Party, Forman was elected to the European Parliament as Brexit Party MEP; author of Forman's Games: The Dark Underside of the London Olympics and journalist for The Jewish Chronicle, The Telegraph, Daily Express, Metro (UK), The Spectator.
- Giles Fraser (born 27 November 1964) English Anglican priest of Jewish ancestry, journalist and broadcaster; regular contributor to Thought for the Day and The Guardian and a panellist on The Moral Maze, as well as an assistant editor of UnHerd; voted Stonewall Hero of the Year in 2012; lectures on moral leadership for the British Army at Defence Academy.
- Jonathan Freedland, journalist and leading liberal Zionist; worked on kibbutz in Israel with the Labour Zionist Habonim Dror (where Freedland had been a mentor to Sacha Baron Cohen); later writing for The Guardian, Daily Mirror, the London Evening Standard, The Jewish Chronicle, The New York Times, The New York Review of Books, Newsweek and The New Republic; in 2022 wrote highly acclaimed stage play Jews. In Their Own Words which the Royal Court Theatre described as a "searing and incisive play looking at the roots and damning legacy of antisemitism in Britain"; son of biographer and journalist Michael Freedland, and Israeli-born Sara Hocherman. He also writes fiction under the pseudonym Sam Bourne.
- Michael Freedland (18 December 1934 – 1 October 2018); biographer, author, journalist and broadcaster; wrote for The Sunday Telegraph, The Spectator, The Guardian, The Observer, The Jewish Chronicle and The Economist; wrote and presented programmes for BBC Radio 2. His radio show You Don't Have To Be Jewish ran for 24 years.
- Ben Freeman, author of Jewish Pride: Rebuilding a People(2021); journalist for The Guardian, Billboard, The Jerusalem Post, The Times of Israel, Dazed Magazine, Jewish Journal (Los Angeles), Jewish News
- Reg Freeson (24 February 1926 – 9 October 2006), Labour politician of Russian Jewish and Polish Jewish ancestry; worked as journalist in the Middle East and continued print career in Fleet Street, where he worked on publications including John Bull, Everybody's Weekly, London Illustrated, News Review, Today, Education , The Daily Mirror and the News Chronicle; wrote for Tribune; edited anti-fascist magazine Searchlight; was co-chair of the socialist Zionist Poale Zion (Great Britain) and editor of Jewish Vanguard
- Matt Frei (born 26 November 1963) is a British-German television news journalist and writer, formerly the Washington, D.C. correspondent for Channel 4 News. He is now the channel's Europe editor and presenter of the evening news.
- Gerry Gable (born 27 January 1937); political activist; was editor of Searchlight magazine; was member of Communist Party of Great Britain; worked as runner on Communist Party's Daily Worker newspaper; left the Communist Party because of their anti-Israel policy and because "first and foremost [he has] always been a Jewish trade unionist"; was commissioned by BBC to produce research for a BBC Panorama programme "Maggie's Militant Tendency"; was convicted in January 1964 of burglary of historian David Irving's flat
- Martha Gellhorn (8 November 1908 – 15 February 1998) American novelist, travel writer, and journalist who settled, retired and died in England; considered one of the great war correspondents of the 20th century.
- Andrew Gold (journalist) (b.1989); British Jewish journalist, YouTuber, filmmaker, author, podcaster;in 2023, Gold launched his YouTube podcast, Heretics; has written for UnHerd, Vice, Jewish News, HuffPost , Times of Israel and the BBC.
- Tanya Gold (born 31 December 1973) is an English journalist who has written for The Jewish Chronicle, The New York Times The Guardian, the Daily Mail, The Independent, The Daily Telegraph, The Sunday Times and the Evening Standard, and for The Spectator magazine.
- Vivien Goldman is a British punk rock and reggae journalist and historian, writer and musician of German Jewish ancestry.
- Jemima Goldsmith (born 30 January 1974) screenwriter, television, film and documentary producer and the founder of Instinct Productions, a television production company; formerly journalist and editor of The New Statesman, served as the European editor-at-large for the American magazine Vanity Fair.
- Jonathan Goldstein (businessman), solicitor, entrepreneur, journalist and op-ed writer for The Jewish Chronicle; co-founder of multinational investment firm Cain; director and co-owner of Chelsea; chair of Jewish Leadership Council, for which he has been vocal spokesman, and critic of Labour leader Jeremy Corbyn, in media and while addressing a rally outside of Parliament, in March 2018.
- Jonny Gould; media presenter, sports journalist, and political commentator; has broadcast on Sky News, Smooth Radio, and Talksport; has commented on antisemitism, conservative politics, and the state of Israel across a number of outlets including his own Jonny Gould's Jewish State podcast; his brother Ash is former producer and long-term co-presenter of James Whale.
- Dominic Green (writer and musician)(born 1970) journalist for The Jewish Chronicle, The Spectator and a commissioning editor of The Critic. He is a columnist and film reviewer for The Spectator, and a columnist for The Daily Telegraph. He also writes frequently on books and arts for The Wall Street Journal, The New Criterion, The Spectator (UK), Standpoint, The Literary Review, and The Oldie. He has also written for The Atlantic, Commentary, The Economist, First Things, The Weekly Standard, CapX and the antiquities magazine Minerva.
- Viv Groskop (born 8 July 1973) of Polish Jewish ancestry, journalist, writer and comedian; has written for publications including The Guardian, Evening Standard, The Observer, Daily Mail, Mail on Sunday and Red magazine. She writes on arts, books, popular culture and current affairs, identifying as a feminist. Groskop is a stand-up comedian, MC and improviser who was a finalist in Funny Women 2012 and semi-finalist in So You Think You're Funny 2012.
- John Gross FRSL (12 March 1935 – 10 January 2011); editor of The Times Literary Supplement, senior book editor and book critic on The New York Times, theatre critic for The Sunday Telegraph; assistant editor on Encounter; literary editor of The New Statesman and Spectator; author of The Rise and Fall of the Man of Letters, James Joyce, Shylock: Four Hundred Years in the Life of a Legend; works as editor and anthologist include After Shakespeare: Writing inspired by the world's greatest author, The Oxford Book of Aphorisms, The Oxford Book of Essays, The Oxford Book of Comic Verse, The New Oxford Book of English Prose, The New Oxford Book of Literary Anecdotes, The Modern Movement, Dickens and the Twentieth Century, and The Oxford Book of Parodies; was trustee of London's National Portrait Gallery; served on the English Heritage advisory committee on blue plaques; advised British government on the award of public honours He served as chairman of the judges of the Booker Prize,; member of The Literary Society; director of Times Newspaper holdings, the publishers of The Times and The Sunday Times; married to Miriam Gross, literary editor; had two children, Tom Gross and Susanna Gross.
- Miriam Gross, Lady Owen; literary editor and writer; literary editor of The Observer, arts editor of The Daily Telegraph, literary editor of The Sunday Telegraph, senior editor (and co-founder) of Standpoint; edited Channel Four's Book Choice; at The Observer, she conducted a series of interviews, with, among others, the poet Philip Larkin, playwright Harold Pinter, thriller writer John le Carré, painters Francis Bacon and David Hockney, Nobel Prize-winning Russian poet Joseph Brodsky, novelist Anthony Powell, philosopher and historian Sir Isaiah Berlin, philosopher A.J. Ayer, and Stalin's daughter Svetlana Stalin; has written for the Financial Times; has also served as judge on the Booker prize and on George Orwell memorial prize.
- Susanna Gross, literary editor of The Mail on Sunday since 1999 and columnist for The Spectator; previously worked as an editor at the Daily Mail, was features editor of Harper's Bazaar, and was deputy editor of The Week; daughter of literary critic and writer John Gross and literary editor Miriam Gross, and the granddaughter of humanitarian Kurt May, she is married to novelist and critic John Preston; brother Tom Gross is a journalist and international affairs commentator, specialising in the Middle East; stepdaughter of Sir Geoffrey Owen.
- Tom Gross journalist, international affairs commentator, human rights campaigner specialising in the Middle East Gross was formerly a foreign correspondent for the London Sunday Telegraph and New York Daily News; works as an opinion journalist and has written for both Arab and Israeli newspapers, as well as European and American ones, both liberal and conservative. He also appears as a commentator on the BBC in English, BBC Arabic, and various Middle Eastern and other networks; has been critical of the BBC, arguing that their Middle East coverage is often slanted against Israel, and has subjected the coverage of Reuters, The Guardian and CNN and what he termed the "cult of Rachel Corrie" to scrutiny; has also been critical of The New York Times, both for their general foreign coverage, and historically for what he terms their "lamentable record of not covering the Holocaust."
- Robert Halfon (born 22 March 1969); Conservative Party politician, formerly researcher, Chief of Staff to Shadow Chancellor of the Exchequer Oliver Letwin; was political director of Conservative Friends of Israel; is vice president of the Jewish Leadership Council; journalist for The Guardian, Daily Mail, The Mirror UK, The Sun, The Telegraph, Daily Express, Evening Standard, Financial Times, The Sunday Times, Tes, HuffPost UK, The Spectator, The New Statesman, Times Higher Education (THE), Prospect Magazine, Schools Week, Spiked, The New York Times Post
- James Harding (journalist) (b. 1969), former editor of The Times; former director of BBC News; co-founder of Tortoise Media, news website co-founded with Matthew Barzun, a former U.S. Ambassador to the United Kingdom, which purchased The Observer in 2024 with the transfer taking place on 22 April 2025.
- Lee Harpin, ( b. 1967 ) In the late 1980s, Harpin regularly wrote for the iconic British style, music, and fashion magazines The Face and i-D; has also written for Daily Star, News of the World, Sunday People, Sunday Mirror, Daily Mirror, Mail on Sunday and Daily Mail, Jewish Chronicle, Political Editor at The Jewish News , Times of Israel, United with Israel ( UWI ).
- Ernest Abraham Hart
- Simon Hattenstone (born 29 December 1962 in Salford, England); journalist and writer; features writer and interviewer for The Guardian. He has also written or ghost-written a number of biographical books.
- Afua Hirsch (born 1981); of Ghanaian and German Jewish paternal lineage; has worked as a journalist for The Guardian newspaper, and Education Editor for Sky News; author of Brit(ish): On Race, Identity and Belonging; was on panel of judges for Booker Prize for Fiction; was included in 2020 edition of the Powerlist of the most influential Britons from African/African-Caribbean heritage; was cited as one of top 100 most influential Africans by New African; in Powerlist 2021, she made top 10, ranking ninth most influential person of African or African Caribbean heritage in United Kingdom; Hirsh is great-niece of noted scholar Peter Hirsch.
- Josh Howie(born 22 February 1976) is a stand-up comedian, raised in London by his motherLynne Franks and his father Paul Howie. Howie is also a journalist who began contributing to online men's lifestyle magazine Blokely in 2011. He also writes for The Jewish Chronicle on Israel, Zionism. culture and New antisemitism.
- Joshua Jacobs, journalist for The Guardian, Bloomberg News, The Wall Street Journal, The Washington Post, Financial Times, The Atlantic, Times of Israel, Haaretz, National Review, Tablet (magazine).
- Matthew Kalman foreign correspondent based in Jerusalem since 1998; has reported for Chronicle of Higher Education, MIT Technology Review, the Boston Globe, Time, Newsweek, San Francisco Chronicle, Daily News and USA Today, Daily Mail, London Sunday Times, and the Canadian The Globe and Mail; currently working with The Independent; appointed editor in chief of The Jerusalem Report in 2012; has also reported for Times of Israel, Haaretz, and is a television contributor for PBS in the United States, and Channel 4 News, UK, and CTV in Canada; also works on BBC radio.
- Isabel Kershner; British-born Israeli journalist and author, who began reporting from Jerusalem for The New York Times; has worked as senior Middle East editor for The Jerusalem Report magazine; also written for The New Republic and has provided commentary on Middle East affairs on BBC Radio; latest book is "The Land of Hope and Fear: Israel's Battle for its Inner Soul"; married to South African born Israeli author Hirsh Goodman, an employee of the Institute for National Security Studies, which is involved in promoting a positive image of Israel, and which Kershner often relies on as a source.
- Ian Katz (born 9 February 1968) of South African Jewish origin; journalist and broadcasting executive currently Chief Content Officer at Channel 4, overseeing all editorial decision making and commissioning across Channel 4's linear channels, streaming services and social media. Katz originally followed a career in print journalism, and was a deputy editor of The Guardian until 2013. He then became the editor of the Newsnight current affairs programme on BBC Two, a role which he left in late 2017 to join Channel 4.
- Mike Katz, chair of the Jewish Labour Movement; journalist for Jewish News, The Jewish Chronicle, Times of Israel, The Guardian, Forbes, Harvard Business Review, The Business Journals, HuffPost UK, New Statesman, LabourList, Camden New Journal, writing mainly on the theory of 'the new anti-Semitism' in Jeremy Corbyn's Labour Party and the demise of his leadership.
- Ben Kentish, journalist , broadcaster; presenter, hosting show on LBC; was previously network's Westminster Editor; worked as Political Correspondent at The Independent; has appeared as political commentator on BBC News, Sky News, Al Jazeera, and CNN.
- Konstantin Kisin (Russian: Константин Вадимович Кисин; born 25 December 1982); Russian-British satirist, author, and co-host of Triggernometry podcast; has written for conservative Jewish Tablet (magazine), Quillette, right-libertarian Spiked (magazine), The Spectator, The Daily Telegraph and Standpoint; has been on the panel of the BBC political programme Question Time, and has appeared on BBC, Sky News and GB News. He speaks and writes on issues relating to tech censorship, comedy and culture war. He is the author of An Immigrant's Love Letter to the West, a 2022 non-fiction which became a Sunday Times bestseller in the first week of its publication.
- Jenny Kleeman; journalist, author, broadcaster; has reported for Channel 4's foreign affairs series Unreported World and BBC One's Panorama,; was presenter on Times Radio; She regularly writes for The Guardian and The Sunday Times Magazine. has reported for HBO's Vice News Tonight, Channel 4's Dispatches, The One Show on BBC One as well as making films for Unreported World; was nominated for Amnesty International Gaby Rado memorial award for her work.
- David Kogan OBE, has worked as journalist and senior executive at the BBC, Reuters Television, Granada Channels, Wasserman Media Group and Magnum Photos; producer working on Today; at BBC Television working on Newsnight and Breakfast Time; and at BBC America; was managing editor - global managing director at Reuters Television; was executive director at Granada Channels and was executive director/CEO of Magnum Photos from 2015 to 2019.; was Premier League's chief media rights adviser.; was awarded OBE .; director of LabourList, an independent news site for the Labour Party. He resigned as director in April 2025.
- Daniel Korski CBE (born April 1977); Polish Jewish ancestry, journalist, political adviser and businessperson; worked as deputy head of Number 10 Policy Unit for David Cameron; vice-president of Jewish Leadership Council. Korski reported for Financial Times, Jewish News, then The Spectator as war correspondent in Libya. In 2008, he was described as a "Balkans expert" working at the European Council on Foreign Relations (ECFR), a think tank. In 2011, he was working as a senior policy fellow for the ECFR and running the Middle East programme there. In 2012, was appointed as strategic adviser to Catherine Ashton, then working as High Representative of the Union for Foreign Affairs and Security Policy; was made a Commander of the Order of British Empire (CBE) in 2016 as part of David Cameron's resignation honours alongside other advisers.
- Dominic Lawson, Former editor of The Spectator magazine and Sunday Telegraph newspaper, has been writing column for The Independent since 2006; also writes for the Sunday Times
- Nigella Lawson, (born 6 January 1960) is an English food writer and television cook. In 1998, her first cookery book, How to Eat, was published and sold 300,000 copies, becoming a best-seller. Her second book, How to Be a Domestic Goddess, was published in 2000, winning the British Book Award for Author of the Year.
- Nicole Lampert, journalist and commentator. Former show business editor for the Daily Mail. Columnist for the Jewish Chronicle. Writes extensively about antisemitism and Israel for national newspapers.
- Norman Lebrecht (born 11 July 1948) is a British music journalist and author who specialises in classical music. Lebrecht worked at the Kol Yisrael news department, part of the Israel Broadcasting Authority. He returned to London in 1972, where he was a news executive Visnews Ltd. from 1973 to 1978;was a special contributor to The Sunday Times until 1991; in 2019, Lebrecht published Genius and Anxiety: How Jews Changed the World, 1847–1947. It was published by Oneworld (UK) in October 2019 and by Simon & Schuster (USA) in December 2019.
- Natasha Lehrer; journalist, writer and literary translator; her translations have received multiple awards, and been shortlisted for several prizes; was joint winner of Scott Moncrieff Prize for translation of Nathalie Léger's Suite for Barbara Loden. Her writing has appeared in The Guardian, The Observer, the Times Literary Supplement, The Nation, Haaretz, Frieze Magazine, The Paris Review; former judge of the Jewish Quarterly-Wingate Prize.
- Lt. Col. Peter Lerner spokesperson to international media and commander of IDF social media activities; was born in London and attended Sinai School in Kenton, before his family moved to Israel; The Jewish Telegraphic Agency ranked him fifth among its most influential people on "Jewish Twitter", and Jewish News ranked him 18th on its "Aliyah 100" list of "those who have made a significant contribution to the State of Israel"; Director General of a new International Division of Israel's General Federation of Labour, the Histadrut. Lerner has written for Jerusalem Post, Jewish News, The Guardian, Haaretz.
- Bernard Levin (19 August 1928 – 7 August 2004) was an English journalist, author and broadcaster, described by The Times as "the most famous journalist of his day".
- Daniel Levy (political analyst); analyst, commentator, author, journalist, former advisor to Israeli government; formerly Israeli negotiator Taba summit and Oslo 2 peace process; current president of U.S./Middle East Project (USMEP); among founders of J Street; son of Lord Michael Levy; was World Chairman of World Union of Jewish Students in Jerusalem; served in Israel Defense Forces (IDF) as non-commissioned officer; worked as head of Jerusalem Affairs unit under Minister Haim Ramon; served as advisor to Justice Minister Yossi Beilin; served as an Israeli negotiator in peace talks with Palestinian leaders during his IDF years under Israeli Prime Ministers Yitzhak Rabin and Ehud Barak; was lead drafter of 2003 Geneva Initiative along with Ghaith al-Omari; current president of the U.S./Middle East Project He previously headed the Middle East and North Africa program at the European Council on Foreign Relations from 2012 to 2016. He has also worked at the director level on the New America Foundation's Middle East Task Force and as a fellow with the Century Foundation. He previously worked as an analyst with the International Crisis Group.; co-founder of J Street and has served on the organization's advisory council; also a founding board member of Molad: The Center for the Renewal of Israeli Democracy as well as the Diaspora Alliance; serves on board of New Israel Fund and as trustee of Rockefeller Brothers Fund; editor with Foreign Policy magazine as editor of their Middle East Channel He publishes and speaks widely on matters related to Israel and Palestine.; has appeared on and written for The Nation, The New York Times, Ha'aretz, the BBC, Al Jazeera, and CNN.
- Eylon Levy (born London, 1991) is an official Israeli government spokesman, serving since the start of Gaza war. He served previously as international media advisor to President Isaac Herzog, after a career as a television news anchor at i24News and IBA News. Levy's work has appeared in Newsweek, Jerusalem Post, Times of Israel, The Daily Caller, Arutz Sheva/Israel National News, Tablet Magazine, The Washington Post, The Guardian, and The Daily Telegraph.
- Martin Lewis (financial journalist) (born 9 May 1972) financial journalist and broadcaster, has worked for BBC, Channel 5 (British TV channel), ITV's This Morning (TV programme) and written for The Sunday Post, The Yorkshire Post, the Manchester Evening News, Express & Star, has been a columnist for The Sunday Times, News of the World, The Guardian and the Sunday Express.
- Tim Lott(born 23 January 1956); author and journalist for The Guardian. He worked as a music journalist and ran a magazine publishing business, launching Flexipop magazine in 1980 with ex-Record Mirror journalist Barry Cain.
- Robin Lustig (born 30 August 1948, London); was foreign correspondent in Madrid for Reuters; worked for The Observer as editor and Middle East correspondent; also presented The World Tonight, Newsstand, Stop Press, and File on 4 for Radio 4, and Newshour on the BBC World Service; presented programme covering sudden death of Diana, Princess of Wales, hours after announcement was made; also presented Talking Point (later renamed Have Your Say) for BBC World Service, BBC World TV; guests included Nelson Mandela, Thabo Mbeki, Olusegun Obasanjo, Hugo Chávez and Tony Blair; later worked on The World Tonight and Newshour; for BBC World Service, has presented every UK election night programme since 1997 as well as United States presidential election programmes; reported on elections in Iran, Israel, Japan, Russia and Zimbabwe; presented The World Tonight from Afghanistan, China, Iran, Iraq, Japan, Kosovo and Mexico; was awarded Gold Medal at the New York Radio Festival and broadcast live from Moscow on last day of Soviet Union; in 1998, won Sony Silver Award; was described in The Times as "arguably the best news presenter anywhere in radio after John Humphrys"; received Charles Wheeler award for outstanding contribution to broadcast journalism.
- Emily Maitlis, TV newscaster and reporter
- Winston Marshall (born 20 December 1987); journalist and podcaster; former Mumford & Sons musician; has written for Jewish Chronicle (on BDS), Daily Mail, Newsweek, Die Welt, Dissident Muse Journal, RealClear Politics, The Spectator, David Horowitz' Frontpage Magazine, Hot Press, Common Sense with Bari Weiss; has interviewed Eylon Levy, Natan Sharansky, Douglas Murray, mostly focusing on the Israel-Hamas conflict.
- Monty Meth (3 March 1926 – 14 March 2021) was a British journalist who was editor of the Daily Mail; was member of the Young Communist League;appointed Member of the Order of the British Empire (MBE) in the 2007 Queen's Birthday Honours for services to the communities of Enfield and Bethnal Green.; author of Here to Stay: A Study of Good Practices in the Employment of Coloured Workers 1972; Brothers to all Men? A Report on Trade Union Actions and Attitudes on Race Relations.
- Victoria Coren Mitchell (née Coren; born 18 August 1972); writer, TV presenter and professional poker player; has written for The Guardian, Daily Mirror, BBC; writes weekly columns for The Daily Telegraph and has hosted BBC television quiz show Only Connect since 2008
- Charles Shaar Murray; proto-punk music journalist for the New Musical Express, of Viennese Jewish origin.He wrote for IT (International Times), before moving to the New Musical Express in 1972 for which he wrote until around 1986; subsequently worked for Q magazine, Mojo, MacUser, New Statesman, Prospect, The Guardian, The Observer, The Daily Telegraph, Vogue, and The Independent.
- Fleur Hassan-Nahoum (Hebrew: פלר חסן-נחום; b. 1973); British-Israeli politician, media expert, journalist, media-spokesperson, policy maker; Deputy Mayor of Jerusalem in charge of foreign relations, international economic development and tourism; co-founder of UAE–Israel Business Council; appointed by Israel's foreign minister Eli Cohen as special envoy for innovation; has written editorials, commentary, and op-ed columns for The Telegraph, Jerusalem Post, La Voz de Galicia, Times of Israel, Haaretz, Ynet News, Gulf Business, Arutz Sheva/Israel National News, Algemeiner Journal, Jewish Journal (Los Angeles), Jewish News, JNS, Jüdische Allgemeine, Salem Radio Network News, The Media Line, The Detroit Jewish News, Jewish Policy Center, Israel Behind The News, The Jewish World, Jewish Chronicle; previously served as president of King's College Jewish Society; was barrister at Middle Temple; served as campaign director at World Jewish Relief; served as senior associate with American Jewish Joint Distribution Committee; CEO of international strategic communications firm, Message Experts; worked with U.S. State Department on embassy in Jerusalem; one of founders of UAE–Israel Business Council.
- Dan Neidle (b. 1973 ) tax lawyer, investigative journalist and commentator, researches and writes on issues of tax law and tax policy; worked as tax lawyer at international law firm Clifford Chance, becoming its UK head of tax ; was listed as one of the 50 most influential people in the world of tax policy and business by International Tax Review, and as one of the 100 most influential people in the world of private wealth by Spear's; was named the UK's leading accountancy influencer on social media by the Institute of Chartered Accountants in England and Wales; served on the National Constitutional Committee of the Labour Party, its senior disciplinary body; advises policymakers in five political parties and was member of the Scottish Government's Tax Advisory Group.
- Robert Peston (born 1960), BBC news business correspondent; author of Who Runs Britain? How the Super-Rich are Changing our Lives; son of Maurice Peston, Baron Peston (1931–2016), an economist and Labour life peer who had worked on the Lords Constitution Committee and on committee reviewing the BBC Charter and was chairman of the Pools Panel.
- Anshel Pfeffer(Hebrew: אנשיל פפר, born 22 June 1973); British -Israeli journalist; a senior correspondent and columnist for Haaretz, covering military, Jewish and international affairs, and Israel correspondent for The Economist.; has also written for The Guardian, The New York Times, The Washington Post and The Times; received the B'nai B'rith award for "Recognizing Excellence in Diaspora Reportage"
- Melanie Phillips,(born 4 June 1951) Neoconservative, and right wing hawkish pro Zionist journalist; began her career writing for The Guardian and New Statesman; during the 1990s, she came to identify with ideas more associated with the right and currently writes for The Times, The Jerusalem Post, and The Jewish Chronicle, covering political and social issues from a social conservative perspective.Irving Kristol, defines her as a liberal who has "been mugged by reality";was panellist on BBC Radio 4 programme The Moral Maze and BBC One's Question Time; was awarded the Orwell Prize for Journalism
- Hella Pick CBE (24 April 1929 – 4 April 2024); in 1960, was UN correspondent of The Guardian newspaper, tutored by chief US correspondent Alistair Cooke; awarded CBE in 2000; was Arts & Culture Programme Director at Institute for Strategic Dialogue, an independent think-tank based in London; author ofSimon Wiesenthal: A Life in Search of Justice, Weidenfeld & Nicolson, 1996; Guilty Victim – Austria from the Holocaust to Haider, I B Tauris & Co Ltd, 2000 and Invisible Walls, Weidenfeld & Nicolson, 2021
- Gabriel Pogrund (born 1993 or 1994) is a journalist who has worked for the New Statesman, Shortlist, Ha'aretz and Jewish News and is currently Whitehall editor at The Sunday Times; won 2017 Young Journalist of the Year at the British Press Awards and in 2018 was a Stern Fellow at The Washington Post. In 2020 Pogrund and Patrick Maguire published Left Out: The Inside Story of Labour Under Corbyn, which in part, addresses charges of, and assumptions about 'the new anti-Semitism' in the Labour Party.
- Eve Pollard Evelyn, Lady Lloyd, (née Pollard, formerly Winkleman, born 25 December 1943); has been the editor of several tabloid newspapers; was fashion editor at Honey magazine; also worked for Daily Mirror; was launch editor-in-chief of Elle magazine in the US and edited Sunday magazine for the News of the World and You magazine for the Mail on Sunday; also worked in television as features editor of TV-am (1982–1983) and devised Frocks on the Box for ITV contractor TVS.; often appeared on radio and TV; was regular participant in Through the Keyhole; was a guest panellist on the talk show Loose Women; in 2016, was appointed the first Chair of Reporters without Borders in the UK. In June 2019, was awarded the prestigious Journalist Laureate prize by the London Press Club. She has been a member, appointed in 1999, of the Competition Commission's Newspaper Takeover Panel. Pollard was appointed Officer of the Order of the British Empire (OBE) in the 2008 Birthday Honours List for services to journalism.
- Stephen Pollard (born 18 December 1964); was editor of The Jewish Chronicle; was researcher for Labour MP Peter Shore; worked for the Fabian Society; joined the Social Market Foundation; Senior Fellow at Civitas; was president for the Centre for the New Europe and in 2007, first chair of the European Institute for the Study of Contemporary Antisemitism;signatory founder of the Henry Jackson Society, a neoconservative British foreign policy think tank.
- Karen Pollock journalist, writer, activist chief executive of Holocaust Educational Trust (HET); was Director of the All-Party Parliamentary Group against Antisemitism; later joined Holocaust Educational Trust (HET); is involved with the anti-fascist organisation Searchlight and London Jewish Forum, as well as the Holocaust Memorial Day Trust. She has written for The Guardian, Jewish News, The Jewish Chronicle, and The Huffington Post; gave TED talk entitled 'The search for humanity in the Holocaust' for TEDxDurhamUniversity 2016. She represented British Jews at United Nations World Conference against Racism. She is a vice-president of the Jewish Leadership Council. She was appointed Member of the Order of the British Empire (MBE) in the 2012 New Year Honours for services to education, specifically about the Holocaust, and Commander of the Order of the British Empire (CBE) in the 2020 Birthday Honours for services to Holocaust education.
- Marjorie Proops, agony aunt
- Richard Quest(born 9 March 1962) journalist and barrister working as news anchor for CNN International; also an editor-at-large of CNN Business; anchors Quest Means Business, the five-times-weekly business program and fronts the CNN shows Business Traveller, The Express and Quest's World of Wonder; Quest wrote the book, The Vanishing of Flight MH370: The True Story of the Hunt for the Missing Malaysian Plane, published by Penguin Random House on 8 March 2016.
- Kimberly Quinn (formerly Fortier; née Solomon; born 1961); journalist, commentator and magazine publisher and writer; publisher of British conservative news magazine The Spectator; has written for The Wall Street Journal, Vogue and UK newspapers The Daily Telegraph, The Times, Evening Standard, and The Independent; was the Communications and marketing director for Condé Nast Publications in the UK.
- Gideon Rachman (born 1963) is a British journalist of Jewish South African ancestry; adherent of Neoconservatism and right wing hawkish pro Zionism; was chief foreign affairs commentator of the Financial Times in July 2006. In 2016, won the Orwell Prize for political journalism and was awarded the Commentator Award at the European Press Prize awards; also worked with BBC World Service in 1984 and from 1988 to 1990, was a reporter for The Sunday Correspondent newspaper, Washington, D.C.; spent 15 years at The Economist newspaper.
- Barnaby Raine is an anti fascist, anti Zionist, pro-Palestinian author, journalist, intellectual and broadcaster, writing for New Internationalist, n+1, Salvage, Red Pepper, Novara Media, Jacobin, Counterfire and others.
- Claire Rayner, agony aunt
- Jay Rayner (born 14 September 1966) food critic for The Guardian, The Mail on Sunday, GQ, Esquire, Cosmopolitan, New Statesman and Granta; first novel, The Marble Kiss, published in 1994, shortlisted for Author's Club First Novel Award; second novel, Day of Atonement (1998) shortlisted for the Jewish Quarterly Prize for Fiction
- Hugo Rifkind(born 30 March 1977); columnist for The Times; presenter on Times Radio; regular guest on The News Quiz, on BBC Radio 4; contributes to GQ; son of Conservative Party politician Sir Malcolm Rifkind; Columnist of the Year in the 2011 Editorial Intelligence Comment Awards, and Media Commentator of the Year in the same awards in 2012; highly commended in the Best of Humour category at the Society of Editors' Press Awards; was Stonewall's Journalist of the Year; also named Best Grooming Journalist in the P&G Beauty Awards; In 2015, at the Comment Awards, he was named Arts, Culture and Entertainment Commentator of The Year. in 2017, he won both Best of Humour and Critic of the Year at the Society of Editors' Press Awards.
- Robert Rinder MBE (born 31 May 1978), barrister, television personality and columnist for The Sun, Daily Mail, Evening Standard; host for TalkTV. In 2014, began hosting reality courtroom series Judge Rinder. In 2019, began hosting Channel 4 series The Rob Rinder Verdict. In 2022, Rinder became a regular host on ITV's Good Morning Britain.
- Nick Robinson (journalist), BBC broadcaster of German Jewish ancestry; was president of the Oxford University Conservative Association; president of the Conservative Party youth group; was deputy editor of Panorama; worked for ITV News as political editor; presented Westminster Live, Weekend Breakfast and Late Night Live on BBC Radio 5 Live, and Newsnight on BBC Two; covered general election for BBC Radio; co-hosted BBC Two's Icons: The Greatest Person of the 20th Century alongside Claudia Winkleman; hosted final debate between Boris Johnson and Jeremy Corbyn prior to 2019 general election; author of two books.
- Barney Ronay, chief sports writer for The Guardian, of Austrian Jewish descent; was educated at the University of Oxford; was included in list of most respected journalists working in Britain as published by the National Council for the Training of Journalists; nominated in the 'writer of the year' category at the 2018 Football Supporters Federation Awards.
- Jon Ronson, journalist, author, documentary filmmaker and radio presenter
- David Rose (journalist) (born 21 July 1959); author and investigative journalist; contributing editor with Vanity Fair; special investigations writer for The Mail on Sunday. His interests include human rights, miscarriages of justice, the death penalty, racism, the war on terror, politics, and climate change denial; author of six non-fiction books and a novel, Taking Morgan, a thriller set in Washington, Oxford, Tel Aviv and Gaza; named News Reporter of the Year in the Society of Editors British Press Awards for 2015; brother of Bernard Rose (director), filmmaker and screenwriter, considered pioneer of digital filmmaking.
- Phil Rosenberg (Jewish leader) (b. 1986) writes for Jewish Chronicle, Jewish News, Times of Israel, regularly appears on British television as social commentator; current President of the Board of Deputies of British Jews; served as a Labour councillor ; served as Director of the Faiths Forum for London managing relationships between various religious denominations; at University, was co-director of Muslim-Jewish dialogue group; ran Arab-Jewish dialogue group at Hebrew University in Jerusalem; works as consultant in government relations, media, faith, and diplomacy; Vice President at the World Jewish Congress, extending influence and involvement in global Jewish affairs; Vice President of the Jewish Leadership Council and a Trustee of the Holocaust Memorial Day Trust.
- Steve Rosenberg (born 5 April 1968); was part of CBS News crew covering first war in Chechnya; journalist for BBC News and has been the BBC's Moscow correspondent since 2003, except for stint as Berlin correspondent between 2006 and 2010; in 2022, was appointed BBC's Russia editor.
- Jonathan Rosenhead (born 21 September 1938), mathematician, operational researcher and Labour Party activist; author of a number of scholarly monographs and works of political analysis, including The Technology of Political Control, published by Penguin Books; op-ed journalist for The Guardian, New Scientist, Haaretz, Times Higher Education (THE), openDemocracy, and anti-Zionist website Mondoweiss; active in the British Society for Social Responsibility in Science over a 20-year period; is chairman of the British Committee for the Universities of Palestine (BRICUP) and information officer for Jewish Voice for Labour.
- Joshua Rozenberg KC (hon) (born 1950), British solicitor, legal affairs commentator, journalist; husband of Melanie Phillips, began career in journalism in 1975 at the BBC where he launched Law in Action on BBC Radio 4 in 1984. At BBC he worked as producer, reporter and legal correspondent; in 2000 left to join The Daily Telegraph as legal affairs editor, where he remained until 2008. After leaving the Telegraph wrote for Evening Standard ; writes for Law Society Gazette and The Critic; wrote for The Guardian's online law page from 2010 to 2016; returned to the BBC to present Law in Action, nearly 25 years after leaving the radio programme. He continues to be seen on BBC Television News as a legal affairs analyst. In January 2016, was made an honorary QC.
- Dan Sabbagh, Defence and Security Editor and Journalist for The Guardian
- Jonathan Sacerdoti, writer, campaigner, broadcaster, journalist and TV producer; covers stories relating to the UK and Europe, as well as terrorism and extremism stories, race relations, Middle East analysis and the British royal family. He is also a campaigner against antisemitism.
- James Schneider (born 17 June 1987) political organiser, journalist; co-founded the left-wing grassroots movement Momentum; was PR advisor to Jeremy Corbyn as Director of Strategic Communications; joined Think Africa Press in 2010, a role he held until he became the senior correspondent at New African; has written articles for publications such as The Independent, the New Statesman, Novara Media, and LabourList.
- L. J. K. Setright, motoring journalist
- Rachel Shabi; British journalist and author; contributing writer to The Guardian and the author of Not the Enemy, Israel's Jews from Arab Lands, which argued that Israel has discriminated against and culturally stripped its population of Jews from Arab and Muslim countries. The book received a National Jewish Book Award.Born in Israel to Iraqi Jewish parents in Ramat Gan, Shabi grew up in the UK.
- Jonathan Shalit OBE (born 17 April 1962), journalist writing for Jewish Chronicle, The Sun, The Telegraph, Daily Express, Royal Television; talent manager and chairman of the InterTalent Rights Group; advises government on the UK's entertainment and creative industries; has guided and managed Charlotte Church, Mel B, Baroness Brady, Kelly Brook, Cher, Dame Joan Collins, Rebecca Ferguson, Katherine Jenkins, Sir Elton John, Vinnie Jones, Kelly Hoppen, Lorraine Kelly, Myleene Klass, N-Dubz, Arlene Phillips, Sir George Martin (the Beatles' producer), Pixie Lott, Sting, Tulisa, Gregg Wallace, Simon Cowell, and the winners of the ITV television talent show Britain's Got Talent. Shalit is chair of trustees and Chief Barker of Variety, the Children's Charity and a leading figure behind the return to London of the Variety Club Showbusiness Awards in 2022. He is also Chairman of the MOBO Charity Foundation (Music of Black Origin), a Trustee of both ChickenShed (Theatre Changing Lives), Patron of the Royal Television Society and co-chairman of the Classic BRITS, and a supporter of Norwood. He gave evidence to Leveson Inquiry into practices and ethics of British Press and was awarded the OBE in 2014 for services to entertainment industry. He also holds an honorary professorship, awarded in 2012, and honorary doctorate at Henley Business School of Reading University in recognition of his contribution to the arts, music and broadcasting.
- Miriam Shaviv (born 24 August 1976), columnist for "The Jewish Chronicle", "Haaretz", "The Times of Israel", "The Forward"; former literary editor of The Jerusalem Post; Features Editor of the "Times Higher Education" magazine.
- David Shukman (born 30 May 1958) journalist, and the former science editor of BBC News.
- Alexandra Shulman (born 13 November 1957); daughter of the critic Milton Shulman and the writer Drusilla Beyfus; previously worked at Arista Records; columnist for The Daily Telegraph and Daily Mail; first novel, Can We Still Be Friends?, published in 2012; was assessed as one of the 100 most powerful women in the United Kingdom by Woman's Hour on BBC Radio 4. Shulman was appointed Officer of the Order of the British Empire in the 2005 New Year Honours for services to the magazine industry. She was later promoted to Commander of the Order of the British Empire in the 2018 New Year Honours for services to fashion journalism; was formerly a trustee of the National Portrait Gallery. Brother Jason Shulman worked as graphic designer for The Sunday Telegraph and art director for Harpers & Queen and Harvey Nichols' magazines.
- Jake Wallis Simons; Editor of the Jewish Chronicle, writer for The Jerusalem Post, The Times of Israel, Haaretz, the Spectator, the Telegraph, a commentator for Sky News and a broadcaster for BBC Radio 4 and the World Service; was Associate Global Editor for the Daily Mail Online, and features writer for the Sunday Telegraph; also worked for the Times, The Guardian, CNN, POLITICO, Newsweek and La Repubblica; author of Israelophobia: The Newest Version of the Oldest Hatred and What To Do About It, published by Little, Brown and Company
- Samantha Simmonds (born 1972 or 1973); newsreader, television presenter and journalist; was a news anchor for Sky News until July 2016; returned to presenting for BBC News in March 2017; has also written for Jewish News, MSN (US), Daily Mail, Daily Mirror, The Sun, The Telegraph, Yahoo News Australia, Evening Standard, Times of Israel, Good Housekeeping (UK), HuffPost UK, Women's Health, Women's Health (UK), TV Times, Glamour (UK), Celebs Now, The Jewish Chronicle, Woman Magazine.
- Ruth Smeeth (née Anderson; born 29 June 1979);Labour Party politician;became director of public affairs and campaigns at the Britain Israel Communications and Research Centre (BICOM) in November 2005; writes for Index on Censorship, The Guardian, Daily Mail, The Independent, The Telegraph, Daily Express, The Sunday Times, The Times, Times of Israel, HuffPost UK, New Statesman;was a deputy director of anti-racist organisation, Hope not Hate. She has also been employed by the Community Security Trust and has worked for the Board of Deputies of British Jews and she is a member of Labour Friends of Israel.; became chief executive of Index on Censorship, an organisation which campaigns for freedom of speech.
- Jon Sopel, journalist; presents The Politics Show on BBC One; one of the lead presenters on News 24; voted 'Political Journalist of the Year' by Public Affairs Industry; shortlisted for 'National Presenter of the Year' at the Royal Television Society television journalism awards 2011/2012.
- Hedi Stadlen (6 January 1916 – 21 January 2004), British, of Austrian Jewish ancestry, journalist, pamphleteer, Communist, Musicologist, better known in Sri Lanka as Hedi Keuneman, was an Austrian Jewish philosopher, political activist, and musicologist. She was one of the handful of European Radicals in Sri Lanka. Matthew Stadlen is her grandson.
- Matthew Stadlen (b.1979); presenter on LBC, BBC Radio 5 Live; grandson of concert pianist Peter Stadlen and Hedi Stadlen, activist and musicologist; worked on Newsnight, The New Statesman, The Spectator and for Radio Times, and has worked as a consultant on ITV political programmes
- Bob Stanley (born Robert Andrew Shukman; 25 December 1964); musician, journalist, author, film producer; member of indie pop group Saint Etienne and music journalist for NME, Melody Maker, Mojo, The Guardian and The Times, as well as writing three books on music and football; also has a career as a DJ and as a producer of record labels, and has collaborated on a series of films about London. His second publication, Yeah! Yeah! Yeah!: The Story of Modern Pop, published by Faber & Faber; third publication Let's Do It: The Birth of Pop Music: A History, published by Pegasus.
- Mark Steyn (born 8 December 1959) is a British-Canadian author and a radio and television presenter. He has written several books. He is Anglican, but has Jewish maternal ancestry. Steyn's great-aunt was artist Stella Steyn. His mother's family was Belgian.
- Zoe Strimpel(born 8 July 1982); journalist, author, and commentator on gender and relationships. She is a columnist for The Sunday Telegraph where she writes a weekly column, commenting on gender, feminism, dating, relationships and identity politics;has also written on relations between men and women for Elle, the Sunday Times Style magazine, and HuffPost. She has also contributed to The Jewish Chronicle, The Spectator, and UnHerd.
- John Suchet, newsreader, journalist and brother of actor David Suchet, son of Jack Suchet, of Russian Jewish ancestry. He is the father of Russia Today RT journalist and presenter Rory Suchet.
- Helen Szamuely (25 June 1950 – 5 April 2017), historian and Eurosceptic, researcher for the Bruges Group (United Kingdom); daughter of Lenin Boys leader, Tibor Szamuely, wrote for the BBC Russian Service, History Today, Standpoint, New Statesman, Guardian, Salisbury Review, EUobserver and Social Affairs Unit; sister of George Szamuely.
- Christopher Tugendhat, Baron Tugendhat (born 23 February 1937),; Conservative Party politician, businessman, journalist and author; Member of Parliament until 1977, then Member of the European Commission, Lord Tugendhat entered the House of Lords in 1993; sits as Life Peer; was features editor and leader writer for the Financial Times; served as Vice-President of European Commission; author of Oil: The Biggest Business (1968); Multinationals (1971); Making Sense of Europe (1986); Options for British Foreign Policy in the 1990s (Nov 1988)
- Tom Tugendhat MBE VR (born 27 June 1973) journalist; has written for Daily Mail, Financial Times, Jewish News, Jewish Chronicle; is also Minister of State for Security; member of Conservative Party, Member of Parliament; was chairman of the House of Commons Foreign Affairs Committee; has served as public relations consultant in the Middle East and was officer in the British Army reserves, the Territorial Army; Tugendhat served in the Iraq War and the Afghanistan War.
- Ed Vaizey (born June 1968) Baron Vaizey of Didcot; of Polish Jewish ancestry; commentator for Conservative Party in broadcast and news media; wrote for The Guardian, The Sunday Times, The Times and The Daily Telegraph; briefly wrote editorials for the Evening Standard; also a regular broadcaster, having appeared on Fi Glover's and Edwina Currie's shows on BBC Radio 5 Live, as regular panelist on Channel 5's The Wright Stuff, BBC Radio 4's Despatch Box and Westminster Hour, and occasionally presented People and Politics on the BBC World Service; in 2010, was named tenth in the 2010 Guardian Film Power 100 list. He played a cameo role as an Oxfordshire MP in the 2012 film Tortoise in Love.
- Adam Wagner; journalist and op-ed writer for The Jewish Chronicle, Times of Israel, Haaretz, The Guardian, Forbes, Daily Mirror, HuffPostUK, New Statesman; barrister, a member of the Equality and Human Rights Commission's panel of counsel. In 2019 he represented Campaign Against Antisemitism (CAA) in its case a formal investigation under section 20 of the Equality Act 2006 into whether Labour Party had "unlawfully discriminated against, harassed or victimised people because they are Jewish"; specialist in human rights and public law, including COVID-19 lockdown rules.
- George Weidenfeld, Baron Weidenfeld, GBE (13 September 1919 – 20 January 2016) was a British publisher, philanthropist, and newspaper columnist. He was also a lifelong Zionist and renowned as a master networker. He was on good terms with popes, prime ministers and presidents and put his connections to good use for diplomatic and philanthropic ends; founder of Institute for Strategic Dialogue
- Victor Weisz, Vicky, cartoonist
- Claudia Winkleman (born 15 January 1972); television presenter, radio personality, film critic and journalist; has written for The Sunday Times, The Independent, London paper Metro and has written opinion-led lifestyle journalism for Cosmopolitan, Tatler and The Independent; has also written for BBC, Daily Mail, The Mirror UK, The Sun, The Telegraph, Daily Express, The Times, and Radio Times
- Jonathan Wittenberg (born 17 September 1957 in Glasgow, Scotland); Masorti rabbi, the Senior Rabbi of Masorti Judaism UK; leading writer and thinker on Judaism; has written for The Guardian, Daily Mirror, HuffPost, Times of Israel, Haaretz, and The Jewish Chronicle. He is Rabbi of the New North London Synagogue,; member of the Elijah Interfaith Institute Board of World Religious Leaders.; has featured on Thought for the Day on the BBC Radio Four Today programme.
- Martin Wolf (born 16 August 1946 in London) journalist; chief economics commentator at the Financial Times; widely regarded as one of the most influential economics journalists in the world. Lawrence H. Summers called him "the world's preeminent financial journalist." Mohamed A. El-Erian, former CEO of the PIMCO, said Wolf is "by far, the most influential economic columnist out there".Prospect magazine described him as "the Anglosphere's most influential finance journalist",; Kenneth Rogoff said, "He really is the premier financial and economics writer in the world". In 2012, he received the Ischia International Journalism Award.In 2019, Wolf received the Gerald Loeb Lifetime Achievement Award from the UCLA Anderson School of Management.
- Donald Zec OBE (12 March 1919 – 6 September 2021); author of over ten books, newspaper journalist and biographer; worked for the Daily Mirror for 40 years.

== See also ==
- List of Scottish Jews#Arts, literature and music
- Lists of Jews
- List of British Jews
