= List of British Jewish entertainers =

This list of British Jewish entertainers includes Jewish entertainers (actors, musicians and comedians) from the United Kingdom and its predecessor states. Listed entertainers are ones who embrace Jewish culture or Judaism rather than simply having Jewish ancestry.

The number of Jews contributing to British cinema increased after 1933, when Jews were prohibited from working in Nazi Germany. In the early 1930s, the Imperial Fascist League's anti-semitic newspaper The Fascist sought to isolate the Jews in British cinema.

Stephen Brook wrote in The Club in 1989 that while there had been Jewish actors in British theatre, Jews had been more prominent as producers or agents. The Independent observed that British-Jewish comedians had taken the lead from American-Jewish comedian Jackie Mason by laughing at their own Jewish neuroses, Jewish mothers, and their leaning towards chicken soup and chopped liver, which they would not have done a decade prior. By the year 2000, British-Jewish comics may have reached their largest numbers.

== Actors ==
- Rodney Ackland (1908–1991) was an English playwright, actor, theatre director and screenwriter; born Norman Ackland Bernstein in Southend, Essex, to a Polish Jewish father from Warsaw and a non-Jewish mother
- Bennett Arron, Jewish and Welsh actor (born 1973)
- Jacob Adler (1855–1926), Yiddish actor
- Sandra Caron (1936 – 2025), actress, ( as well as sister of popular singer Alma Cogan ) who appeared in the films The Bliss of Mrs. Blossom , Carry On Camping, Agony Again and Channel 4 game show The Crystal Maze.
- Sacha Baron Cohen (born 1971), was a member of the Cambridge University Amateur Dramatic Club, where he performed in shows such as Fiddler on the Roof and Cyrano de Bergerac, as well as in Habonim Dror, a Labour Zionist youth movement (where Guardian journalist Jonathan Freedland was a mentor to Baron Cohen); comedian and actor known for playing the comedic characters Ali G, Brüno, and Borat, the latter of whom is portrayed as extremely antisemitic
- Alfie Bass (1916–1987), actor
- Gina Bellman (born 1966), actress
- John Bennett (1928–2005), actor
- Inez Bensusan (1871–1967), Jewish actress, playwright and suffragette in the UK. She was a leader of the Actresses' Franchise League and the Jewish League for Woman Suffrage.
- Harold Berens (born Isadore Harold Berenbaum; 4 March 1903 – 10 May 1995); British comedian and character actor who appeared in The Pure Hell of St. Trinian's, Trail of the Pink Panther and Carry On Columbus films.
- Elisabeth Bergner (22 August 1897 – 12 May 1986) was an Austrian Jewish British actress.
- Steven Berkoff (born 1937), actor, writer, and director
- Ivan Berlyn (1867 – 11 December 1934); English actor of stage and silent film whose career spanned four decades.
- Peter Birrel (born Cohen; 19 July 1935 – 23 June 2004); English actor who played numerous parts on British television for nearly forty years; appeared in the Doctor Who.
- Lionel Blair (1928–2021), TV entertainer
- John Bluthal (born Isaac Bluthal; 12 August 1929 – 15 November 2018) was a Polish-Jewish -born Australian actor, moved to the United Kingdom permanently in 1960, noted for his six-decade career internationally in Australia, the United Kingdom and the United States.
- Josh Bowman (born 1988), actor
- Leonora Braham (1853-1931), opera singer and actress
- Bernard Bresslaw (1934–1993), actor and comedian
- Eleanor Bron (born 1938), actress and writer
- Katrin Cartlidge (1961–2002), actress
- Debbie Chazen (born 1971)
- Sir Daniel Day-Lewis (born 1957); Day-Lewis's maternal grandfather was Sir Michael Balcon, head of Ealing Studios, helping develop the British film industry. The BAFTA Outstanding British Contribution to Cinema Award is presented every year in honour of Balcon's memory
- Cary Elwes (born 1962), actor
- Marty Feldman (1934–1982), actor, comedian and writer
- Fenella Fielding (1927–2018); born on 17 November 1927 in Hackney, London, to a Romanian Jewish mother, Tilly (née Katz; 1902–1977), and a Lithuanian Jewish father, Philip Feldman.; starred in The Avengers, Danger Man, Carry On Screaming!
- Maria Friedman (born 1960), musical theatre actress
- Rebecca Front (born 1964), comedy actress
- Stephen Fry (born 1957), comedian and actor
- Rafi Gavron (born 1989), actor
- Leo Genn (9 August 1905 – 26 January 1978); prolific English actor and barrister; appeared in well over one hundred films, radio dramas, television shows and classical theatre plays; awarded the Croix de Guerre in 1945; was part of British unit that investigated war crimes at Belsen concentration camp and was an assistant prosecutor at Belsen war crimes trials in Lüneburg, Germany
- Joshua Ginsberg (born 1998), Training: The Oxford School of Drama (known for): ‘Cable Street – a new musical’
- Iddo Goldberg (born 1975)
- Brett Goldstein (born 1980), actor and comedian
- Henry Goodman (b. 1950) is a RADA trained British actor. He has appeared on television and radio, in film and in the theatre.
- Laurence Harvey (1928–1973), actor
- Arthur Howard (born Arthur John Steiner; 18 January 1910 – 18 June 1995) was an English stage, film and television actor.
- Leslie Howard (1893–1943), actor
- Jason Isaacs (b. 1963), actor, amongst other roles, has appeared in The Patriot, Black Hawk Down, Harry Potter, Captain Hook in Peter Pan, Battle of the Brave,The Death of Stalin, Operation Mincemeat; television roles include Captain Gabriel Lorca in Star Trek: Discovery; voice acting roles include Admiral Zhao in the first season of Avatar: The Last Airbender and the second season of The Legend of Korra, and the Grand Inquisitor / Sentinel in Star Wars Rebels; was nominated for the Golden Globe Award for Best Actor – Miniseries or Television Film for The State Within and for the British Academy Television Award for Best Actor; also nominated for International Emmy Award for Best Actor, won the Satellite Award for Best Actor – Miniseries or Television Film for Case Histories, and was nominated for Satellite Award for Best Actor – Television Series Drama for Brotherhood. Isaacs was born to Jewish parents in Liverpool on 6 June 1963.
- Sid James (1913–1976), actor
- Tony Jay (1933–2006), actor
- Lesley Joseph (born 1945), actor
- Miriam Karlin (1925–2011), actress
- Robert Kazinsky (born 1983), actor
- Barbara Kellerman (born 1949), actress
- Felicity Kendal (born 1946), actress
- David Kossoff (1919–2005), actor
- Harry Landis (1926–2022)
- Bettina Le Beau, (23 March 1932 – 8 September 2015), also known as Bettine Le Beau, was a Belgian Jewish actress.
- Benny Lee (11 August 1916 – 9 December 1995) was a Scottish Jewish comedy actor and singer; he portrayed Mr. Klein in the British sitcom, Are You Being Served? (1981).
- Anton Lesser (born 1952), actor
- Mark Lester (born 1958), actor
- Dame Maureen Lipman (born 1946), actress
- Leon Lissek, (19 January 1939 – 13 June 2022) appeared in The Professionals, Journey to the Unknown, Hammer Film Productions, EastEnders and Franz Kafka's The Trial.
- Herbert Lom (11 September 1917 – 27 September 2012), a Czech Jewish-British actor who moved to the United Kingdom in 1939; noted for precise, elegant enunciation of English. He is best known for his roles in The Ladykillers, The Pink Panther film series, War and Peace and the television series The Human Jungle.
- Ferdy Mayne (11 March 1916 – 30 January 1998); German Jewish British actor known as versatile character actor, often playing suave villains and aristocratic eccentrics in films like The Fearless Vampire Killers, Where Eagles Dare, Barry Lyndon, and Benefit of the Doubt. Mayne worked for MI5 during WW2.
- Miriam Margolyes (born 1941), actress
- Kay Mellor (1951–2022), actress and screenwriter
- Warren Mitchell (1926–2015), actor
- Julian Morris (born 1983), actor
- Amanda Noar (born 14 October 1962) is a British actress and the former wife of actor Neil Morrissey.
- Tracy-Ann Oberman (born 1966), actress
- Sophie Okonedo (born 1969), actress
- Eric Pohlmann (born Erich Pollak; 18 July 1913 – 25 July 1979) best known for his work in the James Bond films From Russia with Love and Thunderball.
- Ruth Posner (née Wajsberg; born 20 April 1933) is a Polish Jewish born British dancer, choreographer, actress former member of the Royal Shakespeare Company.
- Hana Maria Pravda (née Becková; after first marriage, Munk; after second marriage, Pravda; 29 January 1916, Prague − 22 May 2008, Oxford) was a Czech Jewish actress. Featured in The Unbearable Lightness of Being and Dracula (1974). Other TV credits include: Danger Man, Department S, Callan, Z-Cars, Dad's Army and Tales of the Unexpected.
- Natalie Press (born 1980), actress
- Lara Pulver (born 1980), actress
- Daniel Radcliffe (born 1989), actor
- David Rappaport (1951–1990), actor
- Robert Rietti, OMRI (8 February 1923 – 3 April 2015), of Italian-Jewish descent; over 200 film credits to his name, prominent in post-production work in the James Bond series, Lawrence of Arabia, Once Upon a Time in America, and The Guns of Navarone.
- Andrew Sachs (1930–2016), actor
- Emma Samms (born 1960)
- Danny Schwarz (born 1986), actor, model
- Jane Seymour (born 1951), actress
- Antony Sher (1949–2021) British actor, writer and theatre director of South African Jewish origin. A two-time Laurence Olivier Award winner and a four-time nominee, he joined the Royal Shakespeare Company and toured in many roles, as well as appearing on film and television. In 2001, he starred in his cousin Ronald Harwood's play Mahler's Conversion. During his 2017 "Commonwealth Tour", Prince Charles referred to Sher as his favourite actor.
- Georgia Slowe (born 1966), actress
- Samantha Spiro, actress
- Sheila Steafel (26 May 1935 – 23 August 2019); South African Jewish, appeared in The Frost Report, Z-Cars, Sykes, Dave Allen at Large, The Kenny Everett Television Show, Minder, The Ghosts of Motley Hall, Oh Brother! and The Laughter of a Fool.
- Ed Stoppard (born 1974)
- Gregg Sulkin (born 1992), actor
- Janet Suzman, DBE (born 1939) South African British actress of Lithuanian ancestry who had successful career in Royal Shakespeare Company; was appointed Dame Commander of the Order of the British Empire (DBE) for services to drama; Honorary Fellow of the Shakespeare Institute; was awarded Pragnell Award for lifetime services to Shakespeare and is a patron of the London International Festival of Theatre.
- Clive Swift (9 February 1936 – 1 February 2019), worked with the Royal Shakespeare Company; best known as Richard Bucket in the BBC sitcom Keeping Up Appearances. He played many other television and film roles.
- David Swift (3 April 1931 – 8 April 2016), Actor.
- Sydney Tafler (31 July 1916 – 8 November 1979); acted in films and television from the 1940s to the 1970s including Dixon of Dock Green, The Lavender Hill Mob, Alfie and The Spy Who Loved Me.
- Dame Elizabeth Taylor (1932–2011), actress
- Aaron Taylor-Johnson (born 1990), actor
- Harriet Thorpe (born 1957), actress
- Meier Tzelniker, actor
- Sam Wanamaker (1919–1993), actor
- Zoë Wanamaker (b. 1949), actress of Ukrainian Jewish ancestry; has worked with Royal Shakespeare Company and National Theatre; appointed Commander of the Order of the British Empire in 2001 by Queen Elizabeth II; received Laurence Olivier Award and nominations for three BAFTA Awards, and four Tony Awards; nine-time Olivier Award nominee; received four Tony Award nominations for work on Broadway; has acted in Harry Potter and the Philosopher's Stone; twice nominated for the BAFTA TV Award for Best Actress; appeared inAgatha Christie's Poirot.
- Rachel Weisz (born 1970), actress
- Rosie Huntington-Whiteley (born 1987), model, actress, and designer
- Sophie Winkleman (born 5 August 1980); English actress; member of the extended British royal family; married to Lord Frederick Windsor, the son of Prince Michael of Kent, a paternal cousin of Queen Elizabeth II.
- Henry Woolf (1930–2021), actor; worked with Harold Pinter and acted in Doctor Who, Steptoe and Son and numerous William Shakespeare plays
- René Zagger (b. 1973), actor, known for playing PC Nick Klein in The Bill from 1999 to 2004 and as the voice of Emet-Selch in Final Fantasy XIV from the Stormblood expansion onward. He has also made several guest appearances in Casualty, Doctors and Wycliffe. In 2007 Zagger played the Israeli nuclear technician Mordechai Vanunu, who leaked the existence of the Israeli secret Nuclear Weapons plant at Dimona in 1986 and was subsequently kidnapped by Mossad in the BBC Nuclear Secrets episode "Vanunu and the Bomb". Zagger's father is of Russian-Polish ancestry and his mother is of Spanish-Portuguese ancestry.

== Film, television and theatre directors, and producers ==
- Elkan Allan (born Elkan Philip Cohen, 1922–2006); British television producer and print journalist ; best remembered for creation of pioneering 1960s TV rock/pop music show Ready Steady Go!; was television editor of The Sunday Times.
- Josh Appignanesi (b. 1975) film director, producer, and screenwriter, best known for the feature film Song of Songs (2006), starring Natalie Press, which he directed, co-wrote and co-produced. The film won several awards including special commendation for Best British Film at Edinburgh Film Festival. The Observer said the film "reveals a distinctive and bold new voice in British cinema." He has written and directed several short films, most notably Ex Memoria (2006) which also stars Natalie Press as well as Sara Kestelman. He is the son of writers Lisa and Richard Appignanesi and brother of Katrina Forrester. Lisa is a Polish-born British-Canadian writer, novelist, and campaigner for free expression. Until 2021, she was the Chair of the Royal Society of Literature, and is a former President of English PEN and Chair of the Freud Museum London. She chaired the 2017 Booker International Prize won by Olga Tokarczuk.
- Sidney Bernstein, Baron Bernstein (1899–1993), founding chairman of London-based Granada Group and the founder of Manchester-based Granada Television; described by the British Film Institute (BFI) as the "dominant influence on the growth and development of commercial television in Britain". In 1945–46, Bernstein formed Transatlantic Pictures in partnership with Alfred Hitchcock, and later in his career, was awarded a life peerage by Queen Elizabeth II in the 1969 Birthday Honours List for his services to television, and in 1984 he was made a Fellow of the British Film Institute in recognition of his outstanding contribution to British television culture. Born to a Jewish family, Bernstein left school at 15 and he gradually inherited the property portfolio his father had built.
- Neil Blair (agent) (b. 1966); literary agent, television producer, film producer; joined Warner Bros. Entertainment; became Head of Business Affairs, Europe, worked on productions such as Band of Brothers and Eyes Wide Shut, helped acquire the film rights for J.K. Rowling's Harry Potter series; joined Christopher Little Literary Agency; founded The Blair Partnership. J.K. Rowling joined his client list after 15 years with the Christopher Little Literary Agency. Blair is a UK ambassador for The Abraham Initiatives and a board member of JW3.
- Michael Bogdanov; (15 December 1938 – 16 April 2017) theatre director known for his work with new plays, modern reinterpretations of Shakespeare, musicals; trained at BBC in the 1960s and produced, wrote and directed for television in the UK and Ireland. He was a producer and director at Irish broadcaster RTÉ from 1966 to 1969, and later extensively worked for BBC Wales, making documentaries and feature films, winning several awards.
- Peter Brook CH CBE (1925 –2022); theatre and film director; worked at Birmingham Repertory Theatre, at Royal Opera House, and for the Royal Shakespeare Company (RSC); was named Best Director; also directed films version of Lord of the Flies; often referred to as "our greatest living theatre director". He won multiple Emmy Awards, a Laurence Olivier Award, the Japanese Praemium Imperiale, the Prix Italia and the Europe Theatre Prize; was Commander of the Order of the British Empire, 1965; father of Simon Brook (director), assistant director of The Unbearable Lightness Of Being
- Rudolph Cartier (born Rudolph Kacser, renamed himself in Germany to Rudolph Katscher; 17 April 1904 – 7 June 1994) was a British Austrian television director, filmmaker, screenwriter and producer who worked predominantly in British television, exclusively for the BBC. He is best known for his 1950s collaborations with screenwriter Nigel Kneale, most notably the Quatermass serials and their 1954 adaptation of George Orwell's dystopian novel Nineteen Eighty-Four.
- Simon Chinn (son of Trevor Chinn CVO, British businessman, philanthropist, and political activist), British film producer, founder of Red Box Films and co-founder of Lightbox, which was originally a member of Channel 4's Indie Growth Fund, but later bought back its shares and became fully independent in 2021. Later that year, it entered into a co-production partnership with Warner Music Group. He produced a number of feature documentaries, including Man on Wire and Searching for Sugar Man, both winners of the Academy Award for Best Documentary Feature Film. He produced the documentary My Scientology Movie written by Louis Theroux. Chinn's cousin, Jonathan Chinn, is a television producer.
- Bernard Delfont, Baron Delfont (born Boris Winogradsky; 5 September 1909 – 28 July 1994) was leading Russian-born British theatrical impresario. Delfont was born in Tokmak, Berdyansky Uyezd, Taurida Governorate, Russian Empire (now Ukraine), to a Jewish family. His brothers, Lew Grade and Leslie Grade, also entered show business and formed the Grade Organisation. Delfont was instrumental in bringing Morecambe & Wise to ITV in successful TV show, Two of a Kind (1961 to 1968). He also helped the careers of Tommy Steele, Danny La Rue, Norman Wisdom and Tommy Cooper. By the 1960s, the Grade brothers were all very successful and were said to have a "Gradopoly" over British popular entertainment, with Delfont the country's leading impresario; Leslie running the UK's biggest talent agency and Lew one of the major players in British commercial television. He was knighted and created a life peer as Baron Delfont of Stepney in Greater London.
- David Elstein (b. 1944), executive producer and former chair of openDemocracy. At the BBC, Elstein worked on Panorama and The Money Programme; subsequent production credits include Thames Television's, The World at War and This Week (of which he became editor) and elsewhere Weekend World, A Week in Politics, Yuri Nosenko, KGB and Concealed Enemies. After period as an independent producer working on programmes broadcast by Channel 4, rejoined Thames Television as Director of Programmes. After serving as head of programming at BSkyB, he launched Channel 5 as its chief executive; has also been managing director of primetime productions and managing director of Brook Productions Ltd; also visiting professor at the University of Westminster, University of Stirling and University of Oxford. Elstein was the lead author of the Broadcasting Policy Group's publication, "Beyond The Charter: The BBC After 2006" (2006). He is also a director of Kingsbridge Capital Advisors Limited, and was previously a supervisory board member of two German cable companies. He has also chaired Screen Digest Ltd, DCD Media plc, Luther Pendragon Holdings, Sparrowhawk Media, the British Screen Advisory Council, the Commercial Radio Companies Association, Really Useful Theatres, XSN plc, Sports Network Group plc, Silicon Media Group, Civilian Content plc and the National Film and Television School. He was also a director of Virgin Media Inc and Marine Track Holdings plc.
- Stephen Frears (born 1941), director and producer of film and television; has received three BAFTA Awards, Primetime Emmy Award; nominated for two Academy Awards; The Daily Telegraph named Frears among the 100 most influential people in British culture; in 2009, he received the Commandeur de l'Ordre des Arts et des Lettres and received knighthood in 2023 for his contributions to film and television industries.
- Uri Fruchtmann (b. 1955); British-Israeli human rights activist, film producer, director; non-executive director of Ealing Studios; co-founded UK human rights charity Videre Est Credere; currently Chairman of the Board with film-maker Terry Gilliam, Executive Director of Greenpeace UK John Sauven and music producer Brian Eno; Fruchtmann was Scottish singer Annie Lennox's second husband.
- Lewis Gilbert CBE (1920–2018) film director, producer and screenwriter who directed more than 40 films; among them Reach for the Sky, Sink the Bismarck!, Alfie, Educating Rita and Shirley Valentine, as well as three James Bond films: You Only Live Twice, The Spy Who Loved Me and Moonraker. Lewis Gilbert was born as Louis Laurie Isaacs in Clapton, London, to family of music hall performers, of Jewish descent
- Jack Gold (28 June 1930 – 9 August 2015); film and television director; part of the British realist tradition which followed the Free Cinema movement. He began career as film editor on BBC's Tonight programme; his best known work is The Naked Civil Servant (1975), based on Quentin Crisp's 1968 book of the same name and starring John Hurt, which won the Grand Prize at San Remo Film Festival; other television credits include The Visit (1959), the BBC Television Shakespeare productions of The Merchant of Venice (1980) and Macbeth (1983); directed final episode of ITV's television detective drama Inspector Morse. Other work includes the television drama series Kavanagh QC and The Brief. Gold was an Honorary Associate of London Film School.
- Stephen Goldblatt, A.S.C., B.S.C. (born 29 April 1945) is a South African Jewish British cinematographer, noted for his work on numerous high-profile action films, including the first two entries in the Lethal Weapon series, as well as for his recent collaborations with director Mike Nichols and Tate Taylor. Goldblatt was born on 29 April 1945 in Johannesburg, South Africa, to a Jewish family. At the age of 18 he started working as a photojournalist for the London Sunday Times. One of Stephen Goldblatt's most significant photo shoots was of The Beatles in 1968, who had just finished recording The White Album. One of Goldblatt's shots became a two-page spread in Life magazine; others were used as album art on Beatles compilations.
- Leslie Grade (1916–1979), theatrical talent agent; co-founded Grade Organisation with elder brother, the impresario and producer Lew Grade (1906–98). During the 1940s, company became UK's most successful light entertainment talent agency.
- Lew Grade, Baron Grade, OStJ (born Lev Winogradsky; 25 December 1906 – 13 December 1998) was a Russian-born British media proprietor and impresario; founded the Incorporated Television Company (ITC; commonly known as ITC Entertainment). In 1969, Grade was knighted. He was created a life peer (as Baron Grade of Elstree in the County of Hertfordshire) on 22 June 1976.
- Michael Grade, Baron Grade of Yarmouth, CBE (b. 1943), television executive, has held a number of senior roles in television, including controller of BBC1, chief executive of Channel 4, chairman of the board of governors of the BBC, and executive chairman of ITV plc. He sat as Conservative Party life peer in the House of Lords from 2011 until after his appointment as Chair of Ofcom. Grade entered television industry in 1973 when he joined London Weekend Television (LWT) as deputy controller of programmes (entertainment). In 1984, Bill Cotton recruited Grade for BBC Television. where he became controller of BBC 1 on 1 September 1984, On 2 April 2022, Grade would take up his four year appointment as chairman of Ofcom. Grade was appointed Commander of the Order of the British Empire in 1998.
- Joseph Grossman (1888–1949); pioneer of the British film industry, most famous as the charismatic Studio Manager of Elstree Studios; was born in Dartford, Kent, the son of Myer Grossman and Rosa Morris, who belonged to Jewish families originally from Germany and Poland; was contemporary of Oscar Deutsch and Michael Balcon.
- David Heyman (b. 1961), film producer and founder of Heyday Films; producer of all eight installments of the Harry Potter film series; as well as prequel series, Fantastic Beasts. His work makes him the second-most commercially successful producer of all time. He is son of John Heyman, producer of the films The Go-Between and Jesus, and Norma Heyman (née Pownall), an actress, and Oscar-nominated producer of the films Dangerous Liaisons and Mrs Henderson Presents. His paternal grandparents were German Jews who left Nazi Germany and emigrated to England. In 1986, Heyman became creative executive at Warner Bros., and by 1987, he became vice president of United Artists.
- John Heyman (1933–2017), film and TV producer also involved in television production, consulting, and film financing; in 1959 formed The International Artists Agency, representing Elizabeth Taylor, Richard Burton, Richard Harris, Laurence Harvey, Trevor Howard, Shirley Bassey, and Burt Bacharach. In 1961, formed World Film Sales, later sold to ITC in 1973. In the early 1970s, began to render financial services to major film studios, and is widely credited with creating "structured financing" in the film industry; some $4 billion has been provided to co-finance more than 150 films and television programs, including Awakenings (Columbia), Black Rain (Paramount), Chinatown (Paramount), Edward Scissorhands (Fox), Grease (Paramount), Greystoke: The Legend of Tarzan (Warner), Heaven Can Wait (Paramount), Home Alone (Fox), Looking For Mr Goodbar (Paramount), The Man Who Would Be King (Allied Artists), Marathon Man (Paramount), The Odessa File (Columbia), The Rocky Horror Picture Show (Fox), Saturday Night Fever (Paramount), Star Trek: The Motion Picture (Paramount), Trail of the Pink Panther (MGM), and Victor/Victoria (MGM).
- Erwin Hillier (1911 – 2005), cinematographer known for his work in British cinema from the 1940s to 1960s; Fritz Lang at UFA studios, employed him on his classic M (1931). Soon after he moved to Britain to pursue a career in film. He worked as camera assistant for Gaumont-British, where he worked with Hitchcock; later moved to Elstree Studios, working on The Man Behind the Mask (1936) with Michael Powell, who noted his "insane enthusiasm". His debut as cinematographer came with Lady from Lisbon (1942). His best remembered film is The Dam Busters.
- Nicholas Hytner (b. 1956). theatre director, film director, and film producer; was previously Artistic Director of London's National Theatre; major successes as director include Miss Saigon, The History Boys and One Man, Two Guvnors; also known for directing The Madness of King George, The Crucible, The History Boys, and The Lady in the Van; was knighted in the 2010 New Year Honours for services to drama by Queen Elizabeth II; son of barrister Benet Hytner
- Jeremy Isaacs (b. 1932), television producer, executive, opera manager. Following a career at Granada Television, the BBC and Thames Television, Isaacs was founding chief executive of Channel 4, won BAFTA Fellowship, British Film Institute Fellowship and International Emmy Directorate Award; was also General Director of the Royal Opera House. A recipient of many British Academy Television Awards and International Emmy Awards, Isaacs was knighted in the 1996 Birthday Honours "for services to Broadcasting and to the Arts." Isaacs was born in Glasgow from "Scottish Jewish roots". Isaacs began career in television when he joined Granada Television in Manchester as producer; was involved in creating or supervising series such as World in Action and What the Papers Say; worked for BBC's Panorama, and was producer for The World at War for Thames Television. He was Director of Programmes for Thames between 1974 and 1978. He produced Ireland: A Television History for the BBC and co-produced television documentary series Cold War (1998) and the ten-part series Millennium (1999). Isaacs was founding chief executive of Channel 4, overseeing launch and setting channel's original cultural approach with opera and foreign language film, alongside programmes with popular appeal such as game show Countdown, pop music series The Tube, and soap opera Brookside. Isaacs later became General Director of Royal Opera House, Covent Garden, a role he fulfilled until 1996. Between 1997 and 2000, Isaacs was president of the Royal Television Society. He was also chairman of Artsworld before it was sold to Sky.
- Roland Joffé (/ˈdʒɒfeɪ/; b. 1945) is film and television director, producer and screenwriter; known for directing The Killing Fields and The Mission, which earned him Academy Award nominations for Best Director, the latter winning Palme d'Or at 1986 Cannes Film Festival; began career in television, working on Coronation Street and an adaptation of The Stars Look Down for Granada.
- Tony Kaye (director) (b. 1952); English director of films, music videos, advertisements, and documentaries; directed the 1998 film American History X.
- Beeban Kidron, Baroness Kidron, (b. 1961), author, filmmaker, politician and social activist; advocate for children's rights in the digital world; establishing standards for online safety and privacy across the world; sits as a crossbench peer in the United Kingdom's House of Lords; she is an advisor to the Institute for Ethics of artificial intelligence at Oxford University, a commissioner on the Broadband Commission for Sustainable Development, and founder of 5Rights Foundation; sister of record producer Adam Kidron; daughter of British Israeli of South African origin, Michael Kidron, founder of leftist Pluto Press; niece of Socialist Workers Party founder Tony Cliff and activist Chanie Rosenberg, and the cousin of historian Donny Gluckstein.; appointed Officer of the Order of the British Empire (OBE) in the 2012 Birthday Honours for services to drama.
- Alexander Korda (1893–1956); Hungarian–bBritish film director, producer, and screenwriter. From 1930, Korda was active in British film industry, and soon became one of its leading figures; was founder of London Films and owner of British Lion Films; produced many outstanding classics of British film industry, including The Private Life of Henry VIII, Rembrandt, Things To Come, The Thief of Baghdad and The Third Man; became first filmmaker to receive knighthood.; was born Sándor László Kellner into a Jewish family in Pusztatúrpásztó, Austria-Hungary; his two younger brothers, Zoltan and Vincent also had careers in the film industry.
- Vincent Korda (22 June 1897 – 4 January 1979) was a Hungarian Jewish art director, later settling in Britain, and he was the younger brother of Alexander and Zoltan Korda.
- Stanley Kubrick (/ˈkuːbrɪk/; July 26, 1928 – March 7, 1999), British American filmmaker and photographer. Widely considered one of the greatest filmmakers of all time, his films were nearly all adaptations of novels or short stories, spanning a number of genres and gaining recognition for their intense attention to detail, innovative cinematography, extensive set design, and dark humour.
- David Lan CBE, South African British playwright, theatre producer and director and a social anthropologist; was the writer in residence at the Royal Court Theatre from 1995 to 1997 and was the artistic director of the Young Vic theatre in London from 2000 until 2018. He has produced more than 200 shows.
- Mike Leigh OBE FRSL (b. 1943); writer-director of Russian Jewish ancestry; has received prizes at Cannes Film Festival, Berlin International Film Festival, Venice International Film Festival, three BAFTA Awards, nominations for seven Academy Awards; received the BAFTA Fellowship; was appointed an Officer of the Order of the British Empire (OBE) in the 1993 Birthday Honours for services to film industry.
- Louis Levy (1894–1957) was an English film music director and conductor, who worked in particular on Alfred Hitchcock and Will Hay films. Levy was musical director for Gaumont's earliest sound picture, High Treason and later became the head of the music department for all Gainsborough Pictures productions. Levy became general musical director for the Associated British Picture Corporation, and was head of music at Elstree Studios, where the films he worked on included Moby Dick (1956).
- Verity Lambert (1935-2007) was an English film producer who is best remembered for being the initial producer of Doctor Who and Minder as well as television shows such as Shoulder to Shoulder, Eldorado and Jonathan Creek.
- Dennis Marks (music director) (1948 – 2015), was head of music at BBC Television; was general director of English National Opera; maker of television documentaries, broadcaster and author; originally researcher, at BBC, he became a director and producer of television arts programmes. Leaving BBC to work as an independent producer, Marks invited back by Alan Yentob and eventually became Head of Music Programmes at the BBC. Marks succeeded Peter Jonas as General Director of English National Opera (ENO).
- Sam Mendes CBE (born 1 August 1965) stage director, producer, screenwriter. In 2000, Mendes was appointed a CBE for his services to drama, and he was knighted in the 2020 New Years Honours List. In 2000, Mendes was awarded the Shakespeare Prize by the Alfred Toepfer Foundation in Hamburg, Germany. In 2005, he received a lifetime achievement award from the Directors Guild of Great Britain. In 2008, The Daily Telegraph ranked him number 15 in their list of the "100 most powerful people in British culture".
- Dan Patterson (b. 1960) television producer and writer, best known as co-creator, alongside Mark Leveson, and producer of both the British and American incarnations of the comedy improvisation show Whose Line Is It Anyway? and the British satirical comedy panel show Mock the Week. Patterson is married to Laura Marks, appointed Officer of the Order of the British Empire (OBE) in 2015 New Year Honours; The Jewish Chronicle named her one of the ten most influential British Jews in "The JC Power 100"; was appointed Commander of the Order of the British Empire (CBE) in the 2023 Birthday Honours for services to inter-faith relations, Holocaust education and commemoration, and women's empowerment.
- Emeric Pressburger (1902–1988), Hungarian-British screenwriter, film director, and producer; best known for film collaborations with Michael Powell, a partnership known as the Archers; produced 49th Parallel (1941), The Life and Death of Colonel Blimp (1943), A Matter of Life and Death (US: Stairway to Heaven, 1946), Black Narcissus (1947), The Red Shoes (1948), and The Tales of Hoffmann (1951); was born in Miskolc, in the Kingdom of Hungary, of Jewish heritage. His grandsons are Andrew Macdonald and Kevin Macdonald (director)
- Stephen Poliakoff CBE, FRSL (born 1952), playwright, director and screenwriter described as UK's "pre-eminent TV dramatist" who had "inherited Dennis Potter's crown"; maternal great-grandfather was Samuel Montagu, 1st Baron Swaythling.
- David Puttnam, CBE, HonFRSA, HonFRPS, MRIA (b. 1941), film producer; former member of the House of Lords; received BAFTA and BAFTA Fellowship; sat on Labour benches in House of Lords; appointed chair to the select committee on democracy and digital technologies; was chairman and CEO of Columbia Pictures; is President of the Film Distributors’ Association; Chair of the TSL Advisory Board; Chair of Nord Anglia International School, in 1997, entered House of Lords as life peer; was Prime Ministerial Trade Envoy to Vietnam, Laos, Cambodia and Myanmar (Burma); was chairman of National Film and Television School; was UK president of UNICEF and remains ambassador.
- Karel Reisz ( 1926 – 2002); filmmaker and film critic, one of the pioneers of the new realist strain in British cinema during the 1950s and 1960s. Two of the best-known films he directed are Saturday Night and Sunday Morning, a classic of kitchen sink realism, and the romantic period drama The French Lieutenant's Woman.
- John Schlesinger (/ˈʃlɛsɪndʒər/ SHLESS-in-jər; 1926 –2003), film, stage director, and actor; leading light of the British New Wave, before embarking on career in Hollywood, often directing films dealing frankly in provocative subject matter, combined with his status as one of the rare openly gay directors working in mainstream films; made British dramas A Kind of Loving (1962), Billy Liar (1963), and Far from the Madding Crowd (1967); won the Academy Award for Best Director for Midnight Cowboy (1969) and was Oscar-nominated for Darling (1965) and Sunday Bloody Sunday (1971); acclaimed for his Hollywood films The Day of the Locust (1975) and Marathon Man (1976); later films include Madame Sousatzka (1988) and Cold Comfort Farm (1995); also served as an associate director of the Royal National Theatre; received numerous accolades including an Academy Award, and four BAFTA Awards as well as nominations for three Golden Globe Awards; honours include the Commander of the Order of the British Empire (CBE), and a BAFTA Fellow. Four of Schlesinger's films are on the British Film Institute's Top 100 British films.
- Aubrey Singer CBE (21 January 1927 – 26 May 2007); British broadcasting executive who spent most of his career at the BBC; joined the BBC in 1949; was head of Features Group which included Science & Features, Arts Features, and General Features; was the controller of BBC2 from 1974 until 1978, and spoke to the Oxford University Broadcasting Society in 1975. From 1978 Singer was managing director of BBC Radio and from 1982 he was managing director of BBC Television. He was appointed a CBE in 1984. After early retirement from the BBC, he established White City Films where he was managing director until 1996.
- Walter Stern (b. 1965) music video film director, worked with The Prodigy, Massive Attack, David Bowie, Madonna, Volkswagen Golf, collecting Golden Lion for Volkswagen "Heaven" at Cannes; has created advertisements, film and video for Coca-Cola, Caffreys, BBC, Orange, Adidas and Diet Coke; his work for the Department for Transport, won him award at BTAA Craft for Best Video Post Production; other advertising work includes "Bubbles" for Vodafone, a Transport for London spot for M&C Saatchi and Johnnie Walker film for BBH.
- John Sutro (1903–1985); film producer; member of the jury at the 7th Berlin International Film Festival; was a close friend of Mitford sisters and was part of group of artists and intellectuals with whom they regularly associated in the 1920s and 1930s. Sutro was Jewish.
- Michael Winner (30 October 1935 21 January 2013) was an English filmmaker, writer, and media personality. He is known for directing numerous action, thriller, and black comedy films in the 1960s, 1970s and 1980s, including several collaborations with actors Oliver Reed and Charles Bronson.
- Ben Winston (b. 1981), son of Robert Winston, Baron Winston, is a British producer, director and a founding partner of Fulwell 73. He has won 13 Emmy Awards and been nominated 33 times. He holds the record for the individual with the most Emmy nominations in any one year, when in 2019, he received 8 nominations. Business Insider described him as “the most influential producer in television.” Winston is supporter of Premier League football club Arsenal and is now a non-executive director of the club.

== Broadcasters ==
- Emma Barnett (born 5 February 1985); broadcaster and journalist; main presenter of Woman's Hour on BBC Radio 4 from 2021 to 2024.
- Dani Behr (born 1970), TV presenter, actress and singer
- Raffi Berg is the Middle East editor of the BBC News website; graduated in modern and medieval history from the London School of Economics; was student of Jewish and Israel studies at the Hebrew University of Jerusalem; author of Red Sea Spies: The True Story of Mossad's Fake Diving Resort ( Icon Books, 2020 )
- Rabbi Lionel Blue (1930–2016), radio broadcaster
- Jo Coburn (b. 1967); broadcaster, journalist with BBC News, married to former Downing Street head of strategic communications Mark Flanagan; regular presenter of Politics Live (and formerly also Sunday Politics along with Andrew Neil) and previously had special responsibility for BBC Breakfast; former BBC political correspondent for London; presenter on the BBC News Channel; has presented on BBC Radio 4 ; has guested on the weekend current affairs programme The World This Weekend as well as reviewing the Sunday newspapers on The Andrew Marr Show.
- Danny Cohen (b. 1974) television executive; President of Access Entertainment; previously Director of BBC Television; was Controller of BBC One; worked at Channel 4 and its youth service E4; roles there included Head of Documentaries for Channel 4 and Head of E4;;was Controller of BBC Three;The Times newspaper described Cohen as "the boy wonder of British television". In 2016, Cohen launched Access Entertainment with the businessman Len Blavatnik. Access Entertainment invests in content for theatre, film, television, gaming, the creator economy and the visual arts." Cohen is married to economist and author Noreena Hertz. Cohen has been a regular contributor to The Telegraph, writing on antisemitism in the UK;he has criticised BBC's coverage of the war, accusing the broadcaster of anti-Israel bias.
- Tamara Cohen, political correspondent working for Sky News; previously a journalist and editor at the Daily Mail; spent some time working for United Nations Radio as production assistant; was environment editor at Daily Mail; moved to being political journalist for the Daily Mail and member of The Lobby; joined Sky News, providing political reports and analysis, covering the 2016 United Kingdom European Union membership referendum, the end of David Cameron and Boris Johnson's prime ministerships, and the 2017 and 2019 general election campaigns.
- Jonathan Coleman (born 1956), radio broadcaster
- Mark Damazer (born 1955), Controller, BBC Radio 4 and BBC 7; in 2011 New Year Honours, he was appointed Commander of the Order of the British Empire (CBE) for services to broadcasting, is Senior Trustee of the Victoria and Albert Museum, chair of the Booker Prize Foundation, and on boards of trustees of the Institute of Contemporary British History.
- Vanessa Feltz (born 1962), TV presenter
- Paul Fox (television executive)(1925 – 2024) ; Controller of BBC1 between 1967 and 1973; was Head of Programmes of the ITV franchise Yorkshire Television (YTV) in 1973 before becoming its managing director from 1977 to 1988; was chairman of Independent Television News (ITN) and president of the Royal Television Society; returned to the BBC in 1988 and became managing director; was appointed Commander of the Most Excellent Order of the British Empire (CBE) and was made a Knight Bachelor; was a recipient of the International Emmy Founders Award and the BAFTA Fellowship.
- Sir Clement Freud (1924–2009)
- Andrew Gold (journalist) (b.1989); British Jewish journalist, YouTuber, filmmaker, author, podcaster; in 2023, Gold launched his YouTube podcast, Heretics; has written for UnHerd, Vice, Jewish News, HuffPost, Times of Israel and the BBC.
- Loyd Grossman;(born 16 September 1950) TV am and BBC presenter; Rolling Stone journalist and guest musician with Jethro Tull; cousin of Ram Dass.
- Gerard Hoffnung (1925–1959), frequent guest appearances as humorous personality
- David Jacobs (1926–2013), TV and radio presenter
- Howard Jacobson ( b.1942) has scripted television programmes for Channel 4 and The South Bank Show; his books – Roots Schmoots: Journeys Among Jews and Seriously Funny: From the Ridiculous to the Sublime were turned into television series; presented "Jesus The Jew" on Channel 4 and presented "Creation", for the series The Bible: A History.
- Natasha Kaplinsky OBE (b. 1972) one of Kaplinsky's first jobs was working in press offices of Labour leaders Neil Kinnock and John Smith; presented F2F, youth chat show, for Granada Talk TV with Sacha Baron Cohen; newsreader for Sky News, BBC News, Channel 5 and ITV News; president of the British Board of Film Classification; was winner of first series of BBC's Strictly Come Dancing; was appointed Officer of the Order of the British Empire (OBE) for her services to the Holocaust Commission; ambassador for UK charity Save the Children; vice president (an ambassadorial role) of Royal Society for Public Health (RSPH); President for Barnardo's"; Chair of The Royal Ballet School.
- Ian Katz (born 9 February 1968); British journalist and broadcasting executive; Chief Content Officer at Channel 4, overseeing all editorial decision making and commissioning across Channel 4, streaming services and social media.; was a deputy editor of The Guardian.; also the editor of the Newsnight current affairs programme on BBC Two, a role which he left in late 2017 to join Channel 4.
- Ben Kentish, journalist , broadcaster; presenter, hosting show on LBC; was previously network's Westminster Editor; worked as Political Correspondent at The Independent; has appeared as political commentator on BBC News, Sky News, Al Jazeera, and CNN.
- Jacky Klein (born 28 January 1977) art historian, broadcaster, author; co-presented Britain's Lost Masterpieces for BBC4; co-authored book with sister, Suzy Klein, What is Contemporary Art? A Children's Guide, commissioned by the Museum of Modern Art, New York, published by Thames & Hudson; has also authored works on Wyndham Lewis and Grayson Perry; in 2015, was Executive Editor at Tate Publishing
- Suzy Klein (born 1 April 1975) author and radio and television presenter; Head of Arts and Classical Music TV for the BBC; winner of William Hardcastle Award for Journalism; was assistant producer at BBC Radio 4 on programmes including Start the Week; then moved to BBC Television, working as director and producer on arts and music films; listed in The Guardian's "25 up-and-coming cultural figures". In 2008, she presented the Proms season on BBC Two; has also presented The Culture Show, BBC Young Musician of the Year and The Review Show; For Sky Arts, hosted programmes on Sky Arts 2; also presented Aida from Royal Albert Hall (March 2012) for The Rosenblatt Recitals; was named Music Broadcaster of the Year, winning the Silver Prize at the Sony Awards; has presented global opera broadcasts for Royal Opera, London, and hosted broadcasts of the Royal Shakespeare Company; in 2021, appointed Head of Arts and Classical Music TV.
- David Kogan OBE , has worked as journalist and senior executive at the BBC, Reuters Television, Granada Channels, Wasserman Media Group and Magnum Photos; producer working on Today; at BBC Television working on Newsnight and Breakfast Time; and at BBC America; was managing editor - global managing director at Reuters Television; was executive director at Granada Channels and was executive director/CEO of Magnum Photos from 2015 to 2019.; was Premier League's chief media rights adviser.; was awarded OBE .; director of LabourList, an independent news site for the Labour Party. He resigned as director in April 2025.
- Nigella Lawson (born 1960), celebrity chef
- Olly Mann (born 1981), radio presenter
- James Max (born 1970), radio presenter
- Mike Mendoza (born 1948), Talksport Radio
- Robert Peston (born 1960), BBC news business correspondent; author of Who Runs Britain? How the Super-Rich are Changing our Lives; son of Maurice Peston, Baron Peston (1931–2016), an economist and Labour life peer who had worked on the Lords Constitution Committee and on committee reviewing the BBC Charter and was chairman of the Pools Panel.
- Jay Rayner (born 1966), broadcaster and food writer
- Jim Rosenthal (born 6 November 1947), sports presenter and commentator who has covered eight FIFA World Cups, three Rugby World Cups, two Olympic Games and 150 Formula One races. His paternal great-grandfather, Leo Olschki, founded Leo S. Olschki Editore publishing house, and his maternal grandfather was German Jewish physician and scholar of Friedrich Nietzsche, Oscar Levy.
- Joshua Rozenberg KC (hon) (b. 1950), solicitor, legal affairs commentator, journalist for The Jewish Chronicle; husband of Melanie Phillips; journalist at BBC; launched Law in Action on BBC Radio 4; at BBC also worked as producer, reporter and legal correspondent; in 2000 left to join The Daily Telegraph as legal affairs editor, where he remained until 2008. After leaving the Telegraph wrote for Evening Standard ; writes for Law Society Gazette and The Critic; wrote for The Guardian's online law page from 2010 to 2016; returned to the BBC to present Law in Action, nearly 25 years after leaving the radio programme. He continues to be seen on BBC Television News as a legal affairs analyst. In January 2016, was made an honorary QC.
- Claudia Rosencrantz FRTS (b. 1959) is a British television executive and journalist; formerly Controller of Entertainment for ITV; was Director of Television for Virgin Media; CEO of the Jamie Oliver Media Group; series she commissioned included Who Wants to Be a Millionaire?, Pop Idol, I'm a Celebrity, Get Me Out of Here!, Hell's Kitchen, The X Factor, Ant and Dec's Saturday Night Takeaway, Love Island and Britain's Got Talent.
- Gaby Roslin (born 1964), TV presenter
- Mary Ann Sieghart, (b. 1961) author, journalist, radio presenter and former assistant editor of The Times; on BBC Radio 4, has been presenter of Start the Week and has also presented Fallout, Analysis, Profile, One to One and Beyond Westminster, as well as many one-off documentaries; visiting professor at King's College London; chaired Social Market Foundation, an independent think tank; has been non-executive director of Ofcom Content Board, a member of the Tate Modern Council, and is currently a Non-Executive Director of the Guardian Media Group, non-executive director of two large FTSE investment trusts: Pantheon International and The Merchants Trust plc, and a Trustee of the Esmée Fairbairn Foundation and the Kennedy Memorial Trust. She was Chair of Judges for the Women's Prize for Fiction 2022. In 2018, she was named as one of the Female FTSE 100 Women to Watch.
- Jake Wallis Simons (born 1978 or 1979), columnist, broadcaster, foreign correspondent, freelance features writer for the Times, broadcaster for BBC Radio 4, presenting documentaries and appearing on From Our Own Correspondent; joined Sunday Telegraph before leaving to become Associate Global Editor at the Daily Mail; was appointed editor of The Jewish Chronicle; writes regular column for The Telegraph and the Spectator and the New York Post. His book Israelophobia, a work criticising anti-Zionism, was published in 2023.
- Jason Solomons (b. 1969), film critic, journalist, broadcaster and author; has appeared on BBC News, Sky News and BBC Radio and is former chairman of the London Film Critics' Circle; He hosted Movie Talk in 2016, an interview series on Sky Arts has presented film slot on BBC Radio London's Robert Elms show for more than 15 years; is regular reporter on red carpets, has presented Virgin Atlantic's in-flight entertainment show and has attended every Cannes Film Festival since 1997, when he began first dedicated film diary and gossip column in British newspapers, for The Observer newspaper.
- Jon Sopel, journalist; presents The Politics Show on BBC One; one of the lead presenters on News 24; voted 'Political Journalist of the Year' by Public Affairs Industry; shortlisted for 'National Presenter of the Year' at the Royal Television Society television journalism awards 2011/2012.
- Jerry Springer (born 13 February 1944) British-American broadcaster, journalist, actor, producer, former lawyer, and politician who hosted the tabloid talk show Jerry Springer; also known as political campaign adviser to Robert F. Kennedy; hosted America's Got Talent, Miss World, Miss Universe, WWE Raw and covered the 2016 United States presidential election for ITV's Good Morning Britain.
- Matthew Stadlen (b.1979); presenter on LBC, BBC Radio 5 Live; grandson of concert pianist Peter Stadlen and Hedi Stadlen, activist and musicologist; worked on Newsnight, The New Statesman, The Spectator and for Radio Times, and has worked as a consultant on ITV political programmes
- Claudia Winkleman (born 1972), daughter of Lady Lloyd (née Pollard), presented Strictly Come Dancing: It Takes Two, twice nominated for the British Academy Television Award for Best Entertainment Performance, presenter of Film..., Fame Academy, hosted Eurovision Dance Contest 2007, co-presented Eurovision Song Contest 2008 and Sky Movie Premiere's coverage of 79th and 80th Academy Awards; journalist for Tatler, Cosmopolitan, The Sunday Times and The Independent; judge and the host at the British Film Institute.
- Robert Winston, Baron Winston (born 15 July 1940) is a British professor, medical doctor, scientist, television presenter and Labour peer;has received at least twenty three honorary degrees; author of over twenty five books. He is a member of Labour Friends of Israel; father of Ben Winston, renowned for producing a number of the annual Brit Awards from 2011 to 2014 and more recently he was a co-producer of US Grammy Awards and Tony Awards.
- Charlie Wolf (born 1959), TalkSport Radio
- Helen Zaltzman, broadcaster and podcaster

== Comedians ==
- Bennett Arron Jewish and Welsh Comedian (born 1973)
- Simon Amstell, comedian, TV presenter and actor
- Ronni Ancona, impressionist
- David Baddiel (born 28 May 1964); comedian, op-ed writer, broadcaster and author of over ten books, his latest being the critically acclaimed and well received Jews Don't Count, which is about antisemitism, under-representation in popular media, double standards against, exclusion of, and racial prejudice against Jews in Britain.
- Barney Barnato (born Barnet Isaacs; 1851 – 1897); Randlord and diamond magnate; entrepreneur who gained control of diamond mining, and gold mining in South Africa from the 1870s up to World War I; was known as rival of Cecil Rhodes; prior to mining success, was a music hall entertainer and prizefighter; performed on stage in the music halls with partner Harry, introduced as the Great Henry Isaacs and Barney; became known as Bar-na-to, or the Barnato Brothers.
- Sacha Baron Cohen (born 1971), was a member of the Cambridge University Amateur Dramatic Club, where he performed in shows such as Fiddler on the Roof and Cyrano de Bergerac, as well as in Habonim Dror, a Labour Zionist youth movement; comedian and actor known for playing the comedic characters Ali G, Brüno, and Borat, the latter of whom is portrayed as extremely antisemitic
- Ashley Blaker, comedian and television producer; writer for TV and radio and longtime collaborator with Matt Lucas: was producer of Little Britain and Rock Profile. Lucas described Blaker as "the UK's only Orthodox comedian". Blaker's Off-Broadway show, Strictly Unorthodox, opened in 2017 at The Theater Center. and his second Off-Broadway show, Goy Friendly opened in February 2020, at SoHo Playhouse.
- Issy Bonn, radio, film, and music hall comedian and singer
- Simon Brodkin (see https://en.m.wikipedia.org/wiki/Simon_Brodki)
- Arnold Brown
- Sam Costa, comedian
- Barry Cryer (1935–2022), writer, comedian, and actor
- Bud Flanagan, comedian and actor
- Josh Howie (b. 1976) political commentator; broadcaster for GB News; also stand-up comedian, screenwriter, actor; although Jewish, Howie grew up in Buddhist household of mother Lynne Franks; appeared in BBC Radio 4 stand up show 4 Stands Up; was presenter for Sky Movies show, The Movie Geek. has written for The Guardian and The Jewish Chronicle.
- Adam Kay (born 12 June 1980) comedy writer, author, comedian and former doctor. His television writing credits include Crims, Mrs. Brown's Boys and Mitchell and Webb. He is best known as author of the number-one bestselling book This Is Going to Hurt.
- Paul Kaye (born 1965), comedian, writer and actor (Dennis Pennis)
- Konstantin Kisin (b. 1982); comedian, satirist, author, conservative pundit, and co-host (with Francis Foster) of the Triggernometry podcast; has written for Quillette, The Spectator, The Daily Telegraph and Standpoint; appeared on the panel of the BBC political programme Question Time, and been interviewed on TV media such as the BBC, Sky News and GB News; speaks and writes on current affairs, censorship, comedy and culture war; Kisin is of Russian Jewish ancestry.
- Matt Lucas (born 5 March 1974), actor, comedian, screenwriter and television presenter best known for his work with David Walliams on the BBC sketch comedy series Little Britain (2003–2006, 2020), though in 2020, show removed from various UK streaming services due to its use of blackface
- Robert Popper (born 23 November 1967); comedy producer, writer, actor, and author; credits include The Comic Strip; the Channel 4 show,The Big Breakfast, Bo' Selecta!, Black Books, Spaced and Bremner, Bird and Fortune.
- Jess Robinson (born 1993), impressionist, comedian, singer and podcaster
- Ray Martine (1928–2002), comedian
- Peter Sellers, comedian and actor; descendant of renowned Sephardi Jewish pugilist, Daniel Mendoza.
- Ruby Wax (née Wachs; born 19 April 1953) is an American-British actress, author of popular self-help books, comedian, television personality, and popular mental health campaigner, of Austrian Jewish descent; appointed Chancellor of the University of Southampton; Wax also teaches business communication in the public and private sectors. Clients include Deutsche Bank, the UK Home Office and Skype.
- Bernie Winters
- Mike Winters
- Andy Zaltzman (born 1974), comedian

== Musicians and singers ==
- Larry Adler, harmonica player (American-born; naturalised British)
- Ambrose, bandleader
- Howie B, sound engineer, mixer and producer, worked with Siouxsie and the Banshees, The Creatures, Steve Reich, The Royal Ballet's Carlos Acosta and dub music pioneers, Sly and Robbie, contributed to Jamaican movie soundtrack for Third World Cop.
- Gilad Atzmon, Israeli anti Semite Holocaust denier saxophonist for the Blockheads and Pink Floyd; bebop jazz musician of Israeli birth and Ashkenazi origin
- Beardyman, beatboxing artist
- Stanley Black, pianist, composer and bandleader
- Elkie Brooks, singer
- Ian Broudie, of The Lightning Seeds
- Pete Brown (1940-2023), English performance poet, lyricist, and singer best known for his collaborations with Cream and Jack Bruce.
- Pete Burns, of Dead or Alive
- Tito Burns, bandleader
- Nicky Chinn (born 16 May 1945); songwriter and record producer, together with Mike Chapman had string of hit singles in the UK and US in the 1970s with The Sweet, Suzi Quatro, Mud and Tina Turner.
- George Chkiantz, British recording engineer; was recording engineer of the Small Faces self-titled second album; was staff engineer at Olympic Studios when Jimi Hendrix Experience was recording Axis: Bold As Love; also worked with Family, The Soft Machine, Savoy Brown, Ten Years After, King Crimson and Led Zeppelin.
- Alex Clare, singer
- Johnny Clegg, UK-born South African musician
- Alma Cogan (born Alma Angela Cohen Cogan, 1932–1966) was a Russian Jewish-Romanian Jewish singer in the 1950s and early 1960s; the highest paid British female entertainer of her era.
- Erran Baron Cohen (born May 1968); composer and trumpet player known for collaborations with his younger brother, Sacha Baron Cohen; member of the world music group Zohar who are signed to Ark 21 label, a label owned by Miles Copeland, son of CIA Officer, Miles Copeland Jr.
- Steph Cohen, bass guitarist for anarchist punk rock band, Hagar the Womb.
- Antony Costa (born 1981), member of Blue
- Tony Crombie (1925–1999), jazz drummer and bandleader (Tony Crombie and his Rockets)
- Clifford Curzon, classical pianist
- Ivor Cutler (1923–2006), singer-songwriter, poet and humourist
- Craig David, singer
- Lynsey de Paul, singer-songwriter
- Manny Elias (born 21 February 1953), Indian-born British drummer and record producer, notable for being the original drummer with Tears for Fears during the 1980s; also played with Peter Gabriel and Adam and the Ants and Roxy Music bassist, Gary Tibbs.
- Barry Fantoni, jazz musician
- Nick Feldman, musician in new wave pop band, Wang Chung, his father was Basil Feldman, Baron Feldman, a Conservative member of the House of Lords, and his aunt was the actress Fenella Fielding.
- Justine Frischmann, of Elastica; daughter of Wilem Frischmann who is considered amongst foremost engineers of his generation due to his work on Centre Point, Tower 42 (formerly National Westminster Tower) and Drapers Gardens.
- Ray Gelato (b. 1961), jazz, swing and jump blues saxophonist, singer and bandleader.; known as major force in the revival of swing music. Gelato has performed in a private capacity for Richard Branson, Paul McCartney and Elizabeth II amongst others.
- Jess Glynne, singer
- Graham Gouldman, Lol Creme and Kevin Godley, members of 10cc
- Benny Green, saxophonist and broadcaster
- Peter Green, founding member of Fleetwood Mac
- Adrian Gurvitz, of The Gun & Baker Gurvitz Army
- Paul Gurvitz, of The Gun & Baker Gurvitz Army
- Steffan Halperin, drummer for The Chavs
- Dick James singer, music publisher
- Chaz Jankel, of The Blockheads and Ian Dury's proto punk and pub rock band, Kilburn and the High Roads, as well as having recorded with Sly and Robbie at the roots reggae and pioneering avant-garde Compass Point Studios.
- Mick Jones (born 26 June 1955), musician, singer, songwriter, and record producer
- Laurence Juber, guitarist
- Alexis Korner (1928–1984), British blues musician and radio broadcaster, sometimes been referred to as "a founding father of British blues". A major influence on the sound of the British music scene in the 1960s, he was instrumental in formation of several notable British bands including The Rolling Stones and Free. Korner was inducted into the Rock and Roll Hall of Fame in the musical influence category in 2024. Korner was born in Paris, France, to Austrian Jewish father and a mother of Greek, Turkish and Austrian descent.
- Paul Kossoff (1950–1976), of Russian Jewish ancestry; co-founder and guitarist of blues rock band Free; ranked number 51 in Rolling Stone's list of the "100 Greatest Guitarists of All Time"; son of actor David Kossoff; nephew of Alan Keith; cousin of the judge Brian Keith and model Linda Keith.
- Sydney Kyte (1 June 1896 – 29 July 1981), bandleader and violinist
- Clive Langer (born 19 June 1954) is an English musician, record producer and songwriter, active from the mid-1970s onwards; played in the avant-garde proto punk performance art group, Deaf School; produced records for Morrissey, Teardrop Explodes, Dexys Midnight Runners, Elvis Costello
- Keith Levene (18 July 1957 – 11 November 2022), musician, founding member of The Flowers of Romance with Sid Vicious; was co-founder of the Clash and Public Image Ltd (PiL), also appearing on records with Dub Syndicate, Roots Radics, Creation Rebel, Carlton 'Bubblers' Ogilvie, 'Crucial' Tony Phillips, Eskimo Fox, Style Scott and Singers and Players, his work with Bim Sherman featuring in Richard Hell's Smithereens, and the dub version of the Bim Sherman composition (with Levene's overdubbed guitar) released by New Age Steppers and Creation Rebel on the Threat to Creation album. While Levene was in PiL, their 1978 debut album Public Image: First Issue reached No 22 in the UK album charts, and its lead track "Public Image" broke the top 10 UK singles chart. He co-wrote and co-engineered with Nick Launay, the "Flowers of Romance" which reached number 21 in the UK Singles Charts. Levene also co-wrote "This Is Not a Love Song", releasing his version of the tune on his independently released "Commercial Zone" album.
- Harry Lewis, (born Harris Copperman; 11 January 1915 – 29 April 1998), saxophonist and clarinettist, best known as the husband of singer Vera Lynn.
- Winston Marshall (b.1987); musician; former guitarist of rock band Mumford & Sons; after leaving Mumford & Sons, Marshall started an interview podcast with his father's magazine, The Spectator; his father is Sir Paul Marshall, who co-founded Marshall Wace hedge fund and is co-owner of GB News; in January 2022, Winston Marshall launched the "Marshall Matters" podcast, which was hosted by British politically conservative magazine The Spectator, which is owned by his father, and for which Marshall became a contributor in 2021.
- Daniel Miller (b. 1951), music producer, electronic musician, founder of Mute Records; son of two Austrian-Jewish refugees from Nazism, Martin Miller and Hannah Norbert-Miller, born into a family of actors. Besides founding Mute Records, Miller recorded profoundly influential songs under the name The Normal, "T.V.O.D." and "Warm Leatherette", both of which were groundbreaking in the evolution of post punk electronic music
- Crispian Mills, singer of Kula Shaker
- Anthony Newley, singer-songwriter and actor; wrote "Feeling Good", which was covered by Nina Simone, as well as the lyrics for title song in film Goldfinger
- Colin Newman (born 16 September 1954), guitarist for early punk rock outfit, Wire who were from the first wave of British punk rock and whose debut album Pink Flag, with its breakneck speed one-minute compositions, was highly influential on later incarnations of thrash and hardcore punk.
- Passenger, stage name of singer-songwriter Michael David Rosenberg
- Sid Phillips, jazz clarinetist
- Simon Phillips, drummer for The Who, 801, Judas Priest, Brian Eno, The Michael Schenker Group and Toto; son of Sid Phillips. Simon Phillips is credited with introducing the combination of the double bass drumming that would come to define heavy metal in later years, particularly the ultra fast thrash metal sub-genre which emerged in the 1980s.
- Lou Preager (1906–1978), bandleader and pianist.
- Keith Reid (born 1946), lyricist for Procol Harum
- Mark Ronson (born 1975), musician, DJ and producer; born into the Ronson family, one of Britain's wealthiest families during the 1980s, and the founders of Heron International; nephew of businessman Gerald Ronson.
- Samantha Ronson (born 1977), singer-songwriter
- Leon Rosselson (born 1934), singer-songwriter.
- Rowetta
- Helen Shapiro, singer
- Brix Smith (b. Laura Elisse Salenger; 1962), singer and guitarist, best known as lead guitarist and songwriter for the English post-punk band the Fall.
- Peter Solley (1947–2023), keyboardist of Procol Harum
- Rachel Stevens (born 1978), singer-songwriter, actress, TV presenter
- Vi Subversa (20 June 1935 – 19 February 2016), was lead singer, lyricist and guitarist of anarcho-punk band Poison Girls; lived in Israel in late 1950s working in ceramic pottery in Beersheba under Nehemia Azaz, had two children, Pete Fender and Gem Stone who both became members of the Anarchist punk rock bands Fatal Microbes and Rubella Ballet.
- Yevgeny Sudbin, concert pianist
- Lewis Taylor, singer/songwriter
- Jessie Ware, singer-songwriter, musician
- Louise Wener of Sleeper
- Amy Winehouse, (1983–2011), singer-songwriter
- Eric Woolfson (18 March 1945 – 2 December 2009) was a Scottish songwriter, lyricist, vocalist, executive producer, pianist, and co-creator of the band the Alan Parsons Project, who sold over 50 million albums worldwide. Woolfson also pursued a career in musical theatre.

== Writers ==
- Bennett Arron (born 1973) Welsh writer, comedian and actor
- Gilad Atzmon, be bop saxophonist, anti Israeli, Holocaust denier, anti Semite, activist, dissident social critic of Israel, agent provocateur, satirist and author.
- John Berger, Jewish father, convert to Roman Catholicism, (5 November 1926 – 2 January 2017) art critic, novelist, painter and poet. Berger's essay on art criticism Ways of Seeing, is known as foundation text employing deconstruction and feminist prisms of epistemology and ontology, questioning axiomatic assumptions about gender, racial prejudice and Orientalism, whilst introducing and debating prisms of Psychological projection, Reification (Marxism), False Consciousness, Commodity fetishism, Marx's theory of alienation and essentialism. He was a supporter of the Palestinian cause, and, focused on Israel and apartheid, a member of the Support Committee of the Russell Tribunal on Palestine; father of film maker, Jacob Berger
- Victoria Coren Mitchell (born 1972)
- Ryan Craig (b. 1972), playwright, whose plays usually probe both social norms and ethical issues. He is also a writer for screen, television and radio; best known for his plays What We Did To Weinstein (Menier Chocolate Factory, London, 2005), which earned him a Most Promising Playwright Nomination at the Evening Standard Theatre Awards; The Glass Room (Hampstead Theatre, 2006), which deals with Holocaust denial; and The Holy Rosenbergs (National Theatre, 2011); as well as for writing the English version of Tadeusz Słobodzianek's Our Class (National Theatre, 2009). His most recent play is the semi-autobiographical Filthy Business (Hampstead Theatre, 2017). Craig was born near Hampstead Heath, London, to parents of Jewish, Dutch and Northern Irish heritage.
- James Harding (journalist) (b. 1969); journalist, former director of BBC News; co-founder of Tortoise Media, which purchased The Observer in 2024, with transfer taking place in 2025. In 2007, was appointed as editor of The Times newspaper, the youngest person to assume the post, following Robert Thomson's appointment as publisher of the Wall Street Journal.
- Lee Harpin, ( b. 1967 ) In the late 1980s, Harpin regularly wrote for the iconic British style, music, and fashion magazines The Face and i-D; has also written for Daily Star, News of the World, Sunday People, Sunday Mirror, Daily Mirror, Mail on Sunday and Daily Mail, Jewish Chronicle, Political Editor at The Jewish News , Times of Israel, United with Israel ( UWI ).
- Ronald Harwood CBE FRSL (né Horwitz; 1934 – 2020) was a South African Jewish British author, playwright, and screenwriter, best known for his plays for the British stage as well as the screenplays for The Dresser (for which he was nominated for an Oscar) and The Pianist, for which he won the 2003 Academy Award for Best Adapted Screenplay. He was nominated for the Best Adapted Screenplay Oscar for The Diving Bell and the Butterfly (2007).
- George Markstein (1926–1987) was a British journalist and writer of thrillers and teleplays. He was the script editor of the British series The Prisoner for the first thirteen episodes, and appeared briefly in its title sequence. Markstein also wrote for or story-edited other television series, specialising in espionage stories, and jointly ran a successful literary agency for screenwriters. Markstein was born in Berlin, Germany, but emigrated with his Jewish family to England with the rise of Nazism.
- Claire Rayner (1931–2010), agony aunt and broadcaster
- Emma Richler (born 1961) is a British actress and author.
- Will Self (born 26 September 1961); author, journalist, political commentator and broadcaster; regular contributor to The Guardian, Harper's Magazine, The New York Times, London Review of Books and New Statesman; regular contributor to Have I Got News for You, Shooting Stars for two series; also appears on Newsnight ,Question Time, BBC Radio 4 programme A Point of View.
- Zoe Strimpel (b.1982); columnist and commentator; writes opinion columns for The Sunday Telegraph; has appeared on BBC Radio 4's A Point Of View; was features and lifestyle writer for City AM; has written for Elle, the Sunday Times Style magazine, and HuffPost; has contributed to The Jewish Chronicle, and writes for The Spectator, and UnHerd. She is a columnist for The Sunday Telegraph;has appeared on radio and television discussing dating, feminism, and diversity, including the BBC and Al Jazeera.
- Arnold Wesker (1932–2016), dramatist.
- Rosie Whitehouse, journalist and author. Wife of Tim Judah and mother of Ben Judah; of Iraqi Jewish ancestry. Her historical research and profiles of Holocaust Survivors have been published by The Observer, The Jewish Chronicle, BBC News and Tablet magazine. Meanwhile, her writing about British government policy toward victims after the Holocaust and contemporary British antisemitism has appeared in The Independent and Haaretz.

== Classical musicians ==
- John Barnett, composer
- Julius Benedict, composer
- Maria Bland, singer
- John Braham (circa|1774 – 17 February 1856) tenor opera singer born in London; one of Europe's leading opera stars. His success, and that of his offspring in marrying into the British aristocracy, are also notable examples of Jewish social mobility in the early 19th century.
- Giacobbe Cervetto, popularised the cello in England, born in Italy to Italian Jewish parents
- Israel Citkowitz (6 February 1909 – 4 May 1974); composer and pianist.
- Harriet Cohen, pianist
- Frederic Hymen Cowen, composer
- Isidore de Lara, composer
- Jacqueline du Pré, cellist
- Gerald Finzi, composer
- Norma Fisher, pianist
- Benjamin Frankel (1906–1973) was a British composer of Polish Jewish ancestry. His best known pieces include a cycle of five string quartets, eight symphonies, and concertos for violin and viola. He was also notable for writing over 100 film scores and working as a big band arranger in the 1930s. During the last 15 years of his life, Frankel also developed his own style of 12-note composition which retained contact with tonality.
- Alexander Goehr, composer; son of Walter Goehr
- Walter Goehr, composer
- Berthold Goldschmidt, composer
- Livia Ruth Gollancz, (25 May 1920 − 28 March 2018) was the daughter of Socialist humanitarian publisher, Victor Gollancz and was the first female principal horn of a major UK symphony orchestra.
- Mark Hambourg (Russian: Марк Михайлович Гамбург, 1 June 1879 – 26 August 1960) was a Russian British concert pianist.
- Myra Hess, pianist, best known for her performances of the works of Bach, Mozart, Beethoven and Schumann.
- Alice Herz-Sommer (1903–2014), Czech-born Israeli-British pianist, music teacher, and supercentenarian)
- Gerard Hoffnung, tubist, illustrator and cartoonist, impresario, humorist
- Steven Isserlis, cellist
- Hans Keller, musicologist
- Evgeny Kissin (Russian: Евге́ний И́горевич Ки́син, romanized: Evgénij Ígorevič Kísin; born 10 October 1971) is a Russian Jewish concert pianist and composer.
- Yehudi Menuhin, Lord Menuhin of Stoke d'Abernon; conductor and violinist (American/UK-based), son of anti-Zionist campaigner Moshe Menuhin, father of author Gerard Menuhin (born 1948 in Scotland) and pianist and composer Jeremy Menuhin, descendant of Shneur Zalman of Liadi (Hebrew: שניאור זלמן מליאדי, 4 September 1745 – 15 December 1812 O.S. / 18 Elul 5505 – 24 Tevet 5573), rabbi and the founder and first Rebbe of Chabad, a branch of Hasidic Judaism.
- Benno Moiseiwitsch, pianist (Russian-born; naturalized 1937)
- Ignaz Moscheles (23 May 1794 – 10 March 1870) was a Bohemian piano virtuoso and composer, based in London and Leipzig. Tutor to Felix Mendelssohn.
- Michael Nyman, composer
- Murray Perahia, American pianist (UK-based)
- James Rhodes, pianist
- Landon Ronald, conductor and composer
- Robert Saxton, composer
- Rudolf Schwarz, conductor
- Solomon, professional name of the pianist Solomon Cutner
- Sir Georg Solti, conductor
- Anna Steiger (born 13 February 1960 is a British and American opera singer who has sung leading soprano and mezzo-soprano roles in British, European and North American opera houses; daughter of Rod Steiger and Clare Bloom
- Walter Susskind (1913–1980), conductor
- Richard Tauber, Jewish-born Roman Catholic singer and composer (naturalised British citizen, 1940)
- Lionel Tertis, violist
- Simon Waley Waley, musician
- Egon Wellesz, composer
- Benjamin Zander, music director

== Ballet dancers ==
- Celia Franca, ballerina
- Diana Gould, wife of Yehudi Menuhin.

== Other ==
- Ken Adam ( 1921 – 2016); movie production designer, best known for his set designs for the James Bond films of the 1960s and 1970s, as well as for Dr. Strangelove and Salon Kitty; appointed an Officer of the Order of the British Empire for services to the film industry and Knight Bachelor for services to film production design and to UK–German relations and was appointed a Royal Designer for Industry.
- Don Arden (born Harry Levy; 1926 – 2007), music manager, agent, and businessman. He managed the careers of rock acts such as Jerry Lee Lewis, Little Richard, Gene Vincent, Air Supply, Small Faces, The Move, Black Sabbath, Electric Light Orchestra; father of Sharon Osbourne.
- Eve Arnold, OBE (honorary), FRPS (honorary) (née Cohen; April 21, 1912 – January 4, 2012) photojournalist; She joined Magnum Photos agency in 1951, and became a full member in 1957. She was the first woman to join the agency. frequently photographed Marilyn Monroe; also photographed Queen Elizabeth II; Honorary Fellow of the Royal Photographic Society, and elected Master Photographer by New York's International Center of Photography; did series of portraits of American First Ladies including Jackie Kennedy, Lady Bird Johnson, and Pat Nixon; appointed Honorary Officer of the Order of the British Empire (OBE) in 2003.
- Chris Blackwell OJ (b. 1937), Jamaican-British record producer of Sephardic Jewish heritage; founder of Island Records, the first major label to sign Bob Marley, which has been called "one of Britain's great independent labels;" considered "the single person most responsible for turning the world on to reggae music" and "indisputably one of the greatest record executives in history;" was among the first to record ska music.
- Ronald Mourad Cohen (b. 1945); trustee of the British Museum; member of the executive committee of the International Institute of Strategic Studies; chairman of The Portland Trust and Bridges Ventures; has been described as "the father of British venture capital" and "the father of social investment".
- Simon Cowell, English television personality, entrepreneur, and record executive.
- Carl Davis, (28 October 1936 – 3 August 2023) was an American-born conductor and composer who has written music for more than 100 television programmes; collaborated with Paul McCartney in the creation of the Liverpool Oratorio. Composed music for The World at War, British documentary television series chronicling the events of the Second World War
- Oscar Deutsch (1893–1941); entrepreneur, founder of Odeon Cinemas, the largest cinema chain in the United Kingdom; born in Balsall Heath, Birmingham, Warwickshire, the son of Leopold Deutsch, a successful Hungarian Jewish merchant. His cousin was Arnold Deutsch, spy for the Russians who hired the Cambridge Five spy ring
- Brian Epstein (19 September 1934 – 27 August 1967) was an English music entrepreneur who managed the Beatles.
- Joseph Ettedgui ( 1936 – 2010), usually known simply as Joseph, influential London-based retailer and founder of the Joseph retail empire; described as: "one of the half dozen greatest fashion retailers in the past half-century".
- Uri Geller (Hebrew: אורי גלר; born 20 December 1946 in British Mandate of Palestine Mandatory Palestine (now Israel) is an Israeli-British illusionist, magician, television personality, and self-proclaimed psychic.
- Lynne Franks OBE (b. 1948), communications strategist and writer; founded public relations consultancy and worked with many British fashion brands; rumoured to be inspiration for Edina Monsoon in Absolutely Fabulous; clients included Hamnett's fashion business, Wendy Dagworthy, Harvey Nichols and Tommy Hilfiger, and represented Jean-Paul Gaultier, Annie Lennox, Lenny Henry and Ruby Wax; also worked with Labour Party.
- Lola Lennox Fruchtmann (b. 1990); British-Israeli singer, songwriter, and model; daughter of Annie Lennox and British-Israeli human rights activist-film producer Uri Fruchtmann;
- Tali Lennox Fruchtmann (born 9 February 1993) is a British and Israeli model and artist, formerly the brand promotional face for Topshop and Burberry and the first season of Britain's Next Top Model; daughter of Annie Lennox and British-Israeli record producer Uri Fruchtmann; sister of Lola Lennox.
- Walter Goehr (28 May 1903 – 4 December 1960) was a German Jewish composer and conductor and descendant of Felix Mendelssohn and Moses Mendelssohn.
- Giorgio Gomelsky (28 February 1934 – 13 January 2016) filmmaker, impresario, music manager, songwriter; owned Crawdaddy Club where the Rolling Stones were house band, and he was involved with their early management; also managed The Yardbirds and Soft Machine; ran Marmalade Records.
- Nick Gold is a British record producer, multi-instrumentalist and music executive. He is the former CEO of World Circuit Records and the organiser of Buena Vista Social Club, a Cuban musical ensemble which he established in 1996. Gold is a two time Grammy Award winner. In 2006, The New York Times described him as a "Musical Matchmaker".
- Elliot Grainge (born 6 November 1993) is a British record executive. He is the CEO of Atlantic Music Group. The label has signed successful recording artists including Trippie Redd, 6ix9ine, Iann Dior, and Ice Spice. He is the son of record executive Lucian Grainge and is married to social media personality and model Sofia Richie.
- Lucian Grainge CBE (b.1960), record executive who has served as chairman and chief executive officer (CEO) of Universal Music Group since 2010. Beginning as an A&R staffer in the late 1970s, Grainge has worked in the music industry his entire career. Billboard magazine named him the most powerful person in the music business on four occasions in the 2010s, and was named the inaugural Executive of the Decade in 2020. Grainge was appointed Commander of the Order of the British Empire (CBE) in the 2010 New Year Honours for services to the creative industries. In 2012, he was appointed a British Business Ambassador by the UK Prime Minister David Cameron. He was knighted in the 2016 Birthday Honours for services to British business and inward investment. He was inaugurated to appointment to the Order of the British Empire and Knight Bachelor on 29 November 2016. In 2020, Billboard named Grainge as the first-ever Executive of the Decade after he topped the magazine's "Power 100" list as the most powerful person in the music business in 2013, 2015, 2016 and 2019. He is the only person to ever hold that distinction more than once and for consecutive years. He was subsequently named No. 1 on the list for 2022 and 2023 for a record six times.
- Nigel Grainge (1946 – 2017); music executive, founder of Ensign Records; he was responsible for the marketing and chart success of many hits by acts such as Faron Young, the Detroit Emeralds, The Stylistics, Chuck Berry, Rod Stewart; directly signed Thin Lizzy, 10cc, The Steve Miller Band.
- Derek Green, management, Public Relations and promotion for A&M Records.
- Arnold Haskell (19 July 1903, London – 14 November 1980, Bath) was a British dance critic who founded the Camargo Society in 1930. With Ninette de Valois, he was influential in the development of the Royal Ballet School.
- Jonty Hurwitz (born 2 September 1969) British South African artist, engineer and entrepreneur. Hurwitz creates scientifically inspired artworks and anamorphic sculptures; recognised for the smallest human form ever created using nano technology. Also founder (with Errol Damelin) of Wonga.com, also known as Wonga, a payday loan firm.
- Nathan Joseph (23 July 1939 – 30 August 2005) was a British record company founder, theatrical producer and talent agent; pioneer in the development of independent record companies in the 1960s and 1970s; founder of Transatlantic Records, an independent British record company that flourished between 1961 and 1977.
- Hans Keller (11 March 1919 – 6 November 1985) was a Viennese Jewish British musician and writer, who made significant contributions to musicology and music criticism; best known for his appearance on TV show The Look of the Week in which he interviewed Syd Barrett and Roger Waters. Keller was generally puzzled by, or even contemptuous of, the group and its music, opening with the comment "why has it all got to be so terribly loud?"
- Anish Kapoor CBE RA (b. 1954) is a British sculptor specializing in installation art and conceptual art. Born in Mumbai, An image of Kapoor features in the British cultural icons section of the newly designed British passport in 2015. In 2016, he was announced as a recipient of the LennonOno Grant for Peace. Kapoor has received several distinctions and prizes, such as the Premio Duemila Prize at the 44th Venice Biennale in 1990, the Turner Prize in 1991, the Unilever Commission for the Turbine Hall at Tate Modern, the Padma Bhushan by the Indian government in 2012, a knighthood in the 2013 Birthday Honours for services to visual arts, an honorary doctorate degree from the University of Oxford in 2014. and the 2017 Genesis Prize for "being one of the most influential and innovative artists of his generation and for his many years of advocacy for refugees and displaced people".
- Paul Kemsley, (b.1967) Boy George’s manager, music manager, businessman, property developer, media personality; has appeared on reality television show The Real Housewives of Beverly Hills; he is former Vice-Chairman of Tottenham Hotspur and former chairman of New York Cosmos; personal wealth estimated at £180 million in Sunday Times Rich List 2008
- Lee Kern, British Israeli script writer, far right wing Zionist blogger, worked with Sacha Baron Cohen on the Borat character.
- Jonathan Kestenbaum, Baron Kestenbaum ( b. 1959), served on Board of Royal Shakespeare Company; was involved in developing the new Royal Shakespeare Theatre in Stratford-Upon-Avon; Honorary Fellow of the Royal College of Art.
- Adam Kidron began career in record industry in 1978; worked in record production for Rough Trade Records, Stiff Records; worked with The Blockheads; produced Scritti Politti and Orange Juice. Kidron's father was Marxist economist Michael Kidron, best known for his book Western Capitalism Since the War. Adam Kidron is the brother of film director Beeban Kidron.
- Jacob Kramer (26 December 1892 – 4 February 1962) was a Ukrainian Jewish born painter who spent all of his working life in England
- Philip de László (born Fülöp Laub; Hungarian: László Fülöp Elek; 30 April 1869 – 22 November 1937) was an Anglo- Hungarian Jewish painter known particularly for his portraits of royal and aristocratic personages.
- David Morris Levy and Jacques Levy; founders of Embassy Records; later taken over by Columbia Records; also founders of Oriole Records.
- Michael Levy, Baron Levy, (born 11 July 1944), Labour Party peer, was chairman and CEO of group of music companies; founded Magnet Records, one of the most successful independent labels of its day and, at one stage, had 10% of British singles market; artists on label included Alvin Stardust, Adrian Baker, Chris Rea, Bad Manners, Darts, Susan Cadogan, Silver Convention and Guys 'n' Dolls. Levy sold Magnet Records to Warner Brothers in 1988 for £10m; now consultant for number of companies and is chairman of finance company; spent nine years as Tony Blair's special envoy to Middle East; described by The Jerusalem Post as "undoubtedly the notional leader of British Jewry"; father of Daniel Levy (political analyst) (Hebrew: דניאל לוי), commentator, author, former advisor to Israeli government with expertise on Middle East and the Israeli–Palestinian conflict; formerly Israeli negotiator as part of Taba summit and Oslo 2 peace process; current president of the U.S./Middle East Project (USMEP); was founder of J Street.
- Flora Lion (3 December 1878 – 15 May 1958), English portrait painter, known for her portraits of society figures and murals
- Romek Marber (25 November 1925 – 30 March 2020) was a Polish Jewish British graphic designer and academic known for his work illustrating the covers of Penguin Books, The Economist, New Society, Town and Queen magazines, Nicholson's London Guides, BBC Television, Columbia Pictures, the London Planetarium and others.
- Albert Marchinsky, (1875 – July 1930) was a Polish Jewish stage magician.
- Laura Marks (born 26 April 1960); inter-faith social activist, policy adviser, writer and media commentator; sits on the board of the Jewish News. She is a regular media commentator, contributing to platforms including BBC Radio 2 Pause for Thought, BBC Breakfast, BBC London News, HuffPost, Evening Standard, The Jewish Chronicle, Jewish News, The Times of Israel and the Ham & High.
- Enid Marx, distant cousin of Karl Marx, RDI (20 October 1902 – 18 May 1998), was an English painter and designer, best known for her industrial textile designs for the London Transport Board and the Utility furniture Scheme. Marx was the first female engraver to be designated as a Royal Designer for Industry.
- Isabel Maxwell, (born 16 August 1950, daughter of Robert Maxwell) film maker for Southern Television in the UK; in 1973, Maxwell made her first film, an adaptation of the book Jonathan Livingston Seagull, entrepreneur and the co-founder of Magellan, an early search engine, listed as a Technology Pioneer of the World Economic Forum, She served as the President of Commtouch, an Israeliinternet company that became CYREN. She was a Director of Israel Venture Network and built up their Social Entrepreneur program in Israel from 2004 to 2010.
- Malcolm McLaren (22 January 1946 – 8 April 2010) was an English fashion designer and music manager. He was a promoter and a manager for punk rock and new wave bands such as New York Dolls, Sex Pistols, Adam and the Ants, and Bow Wow Wow, and was an early commercial architect of the punk subculture. McLaren was of Sephardic Jewish matrilineal ancestry.
- Jonathan Mendelsohn, Baron Mendelsohn; spokesman and lobbyist for the gambling company PartyGaming which merged with bwin Interactive Entertainment and Bwin.Party Digital Entertainment; former chairman of Labour Friends of Israel.
- Nicola Mendelsohn (née Clyne; born 29 August 1971) vice-president for Europe, the Middle East and Africa for Facebook; co-chair of the Creative Industries Council; director of the Bailey's Prize for Women's Fiction.; first female president of the Institute of Practitioners in Advertising; chairman of the corporate board of Women's Aid, president of the Women's Advertising Club of London.; serves on the UK government's Digital Economy Council, the Mayor of London's Business Advisory Board, and is co-president of the charity Norwood
- Maurice Oberstein (26 September 1928—13 August 2001) was a British American music business executive; credited as "one of the chief architects of the modern UK record industry"; instrumental figure in early UK punk rock; promoted the Clash and Adam and the Ants.
- Andrew Loog Oldham (born 29 January 1944) British Australian record producer, talent manager, impresario and author; manager and producer of the Rolling Stones from 1963 to 1967; also worked with Jimmy Page and Nico.
- Sharon Osbourne née Levy, daughter of Don Arden of Ashkenazi descent, music manager and wife of Black Sabbath vocalist, Ozzy Osbourne.
- Larry Parnes (3 September 1929 – 4 August 1989); music manager and impresario; seen as the first major British rock manager, and managed the most successful British rock and roll singers of the late 1950s and early 1960s.
- David Pearl (businessman), property developer ; appeared on the Channel 4 show The Secret Millionaire; vice president of Tottenham Hotspur; according to Sunday Times Rich List he was worth £456 million.
- Philip Sallon (b. 1951), club promoter, event organiser, socialite, style innovator, impresario, and clothing designer. He was born in London, England. He is particularly known for being a prominent member of the Punk sub-cultural and New Romantic pop cultural movements during the 1970s and 1980s. Philip Sallon was born in London in 1951, grandson of Polish Jewish immigrant tailors who moved to the UK in 1904. His father, Ralph Sallon , was a well-known caricaturist.
- Ian Saville (born 1953), magician
- Anna Scher (1944 – 2023) teacher known for her contributions to drama education; established the Anna Scher Theatre; appointed a Member of the Order of the British Empire (MBE).
- Jason Shulman; sculptor, photographer; worked as graphic designer for The Sunday Telegraph and art director for Harpers & Queen and Harvey Nichols' magazines; father is drama critic Milton Shulman, and mother, journalist Drusilla Beyfus; his sisters are Alexandra Shulman CBE (born 13 November 1957) former editor of Vogue, and Nicola Shulman
- Yaakov Asher Sinclair, British-Israeli rabbi living in Jerusalem; author and lecturer on Jewish religion; had prior career as actor, photographer, music producer, and stage producer; previously known as John Sinclair he was – along with sister Jill – director of the SARM East music recording studio; was producer on many of the early recordings of Foreigner, and both of The Buggles' studio albums; was part of the cast of the original West End production of Hair
- Oda Slobodskaya (28 November/10 December 1888 – 30 July 1970) was a Russian Jewish soprano who became a British citizen.
- Harold Tillman CBE (b. 1945), retail entrepreneur, investor, formerly head of Jaeger and Aquascutum, awarded CBE, was chair of British Fashion Council, was appointed Chair of Fashion Matters, London College of Fashion's fundraising committee, Enterprise and Business Advisor for the London College of Fashion, Honorary Professor of the University of Arts, was appointed Commander of the Order of the British Empire (CBE) for services to the fashion industry , was awarded the Freedom of the City of London, was appointed as London College of Fashion's Enterprise and Business Advisor.
- Geoff Travis (b. 1952), founder of both Rough Trade Records and the Rough Trade chain of record shops; former drama teacher and owner of a punk record shop, Travis founded the Rough Trade label in 1978; His ancestors emigrated from Romania and Ukraine.
- Monica van der Zyl (27 April 1935 – 6 March 2021) was a German Jewish actress based in the United Kingdom, known for her dubbing work on the James Bond film franchise; mother of Marie van der Zyl (née Kaye; born November 1965), who is the 48th President of the Board of Deputies of British Jews.
- John Woolf, rap and grime CEO, promotor and founder of "A-List Management", the record label that Wiley released his music on.
- Sylvia Young (1939 – 2025), founder and principal of Sylvia Young Theatre School in London, England, appointed Officer of the Order of the British Empire (OBE) for her services to the arts.
- Michael Zilkha, (born 1954) co-founder of ZE Records, who signed up James White and the Blacks, Was (Not Was), Kid Creole and the Coconuts, Lydia Lunch, Lizzy Mercier Descloux, Cristina, The Waitresses, Bill Laswell's Material and Richard Strange, together with more established performers including John Cale and Suicide.

== See also ==
- Lists of Jews
- List of British Jews

== Sources ==
- Lewisohn, Mark (2013). The Beatles: All These Years. Crown Archetype. ISBN 978-1-101-90329-2.
- JYB = Jewish Year Book
- TimesAd: The Times, 6/7/06 p34: "A Call by Jews in Britain" (advert signed by 300 British Jews)
