= Robert W. Spike =

American clergyman, theologian and civil rights leader

Robert Warren Spike (November 13, 1923 – October 17, 1966) was an American clergyman, theologian, and civil rights leader.

== Early life ==
Spike was born in Buffalo, New York and educated at Denison University, Union Theological Seminary, Columbia University, and Colgate-Rochester Divinity School. He began his career as pastor at the mainline Protestant Judson Memorial Church on Washington Square in Greenwich Village in 1949, reviving the social activism of this famous urban church. During his tenure there neighborhood kids played basketball in the church's ramshackle gym and an interracial, international residence for students was established. Spike also helped to create an art gallery where artists such as Claes Oldenburg, Allen Kaprow and Jim Dine could exhibit their, then unconventional, work.

== Civil rights ==
In 1958 Spike left his parish ministry to take on a national role as General Secretary of the United Church Board For Homeland Ministries. In 1963 he was appointed the executive director of the National Council of Churches’ Commission on Religion and Race, which became an important arm of the Civil Rights Movement. Anna Arnold Hedgeman joined his staff there as a Coordinator of Special Events. Through Spike’s efforts Protestant churches participated significantly in the March on Washington in August 1963. Spike worked with Bob Moses to set up the Freedom Summer project.

== Death ==
In January 1966 Spike took a position as Professor of Ministry and Director of the Doctor of Ministry Program in the Divinity School at the University of Chicago. Less than a year after assuming his post in Chicago, Spike was bludgeoned to death at Ohio State University in Columbus on October 17, 1966. No one was ever tried for his murder; after a systematic review some church sources believe that he was assassinated. Police investigations attempted to link Spike's murder with his bisexuality.

Upon learning of Rev. Spike's death, Martin Luther King Jr. was quoted as stating, "He was one of those rare individuals who sought at every point to make religion relevant to the social issues of our time. He lifted religion from the stagnant arena of pious irrelevancies and sanctimonious trivialities. His brilliant and dedicated work will be an inspiration to generals yet unborn. We will always remember his unswerving devotion to the legitimate aspirations of oppressed people for freedom and human dignity. It was my personal pleasure and sacred privilege to work closely with him in various undertakings."

Spike's son, Paul Robert Spike is an American author, editor and journalist best known as the author of the 1973 memoir Photographs of My Father about the murder of his father, in 1966.

== Works and publications ==
- In but not of the world : a notebook of theology and practice in the local church. New York Association Press. 1957.
- Safe in bondage : an appraisal of the church’s mission to America. Friendship Press. 1960.
- To be a man. New York Association Press. 1961.
- Civil rights involvement : model for mission : a message to churchmen. Detroit Industrial Mission. 1965.
- The freedom revolution and the churches. New York Association Press. 1965.
