= Asher Tlalim =

Israeli filmmaker (1950–2022)

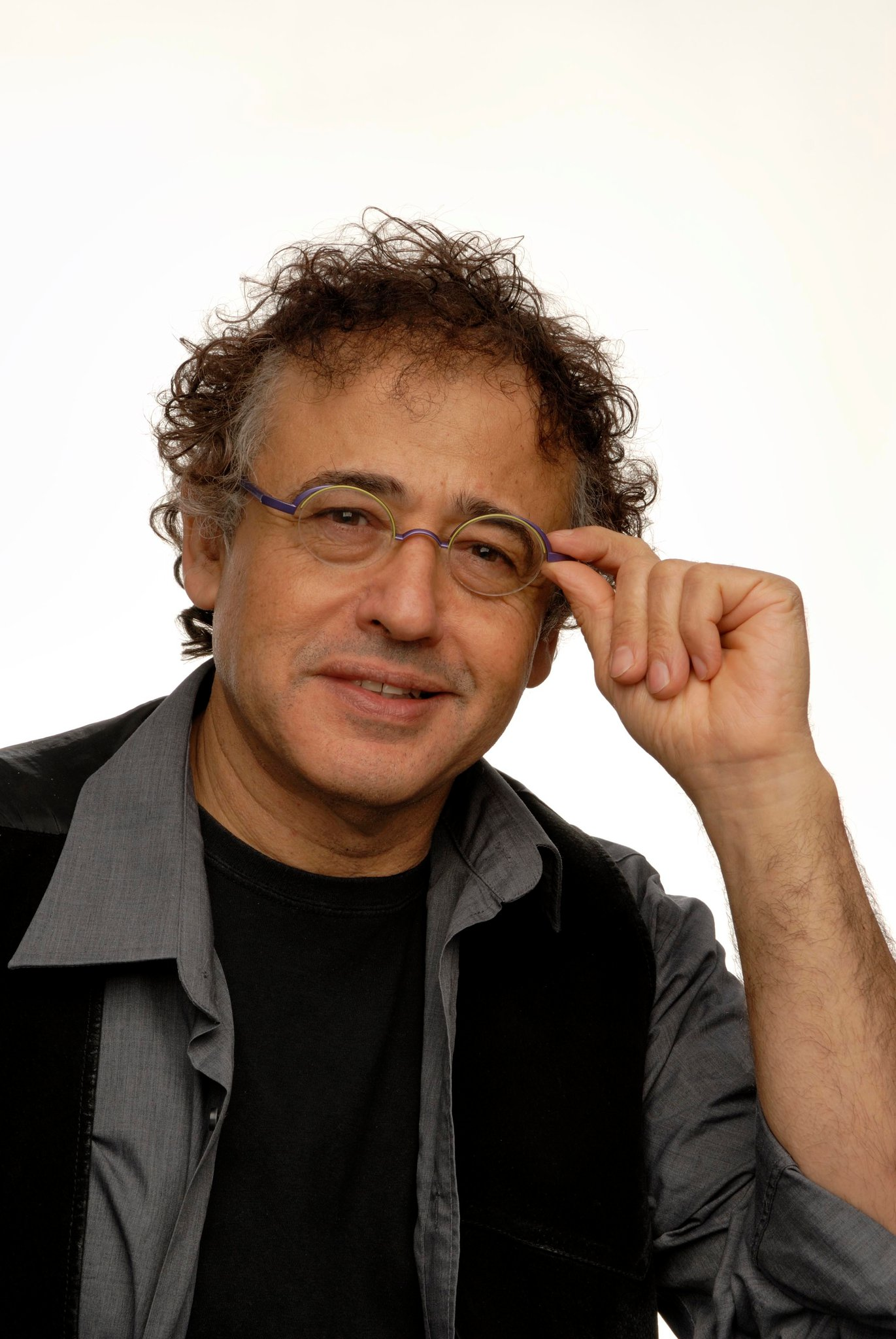

Asher Tlalim (Hebrew: אשר טללים; a.k.a. Asher de Bentolila Tlalim, 30 March 1950 – 21 October 2022) was an Israeli filmmaker, born in Tangier (then an international city, now part of Morocco), who grew up in Spain and since the beginning of the millennium was based in London. Tlalim was mostly known for his 1989-90 trilogy Kol ha’Anashim Ha’bodedim (All the Lonely People, recipient of the 1990 Wolgin Prize, Jerusalem Film Festival); for his 1994 film Don’t Touch My Holocaust (recipient of the Israeli Academy Award prize, currently named Ophir Award); his critically acclaimed film Galoot, exile in Hebrew as well as his children's videos, Dig-dig-dug 1, 2 & 3 and others.

Tlalim's films have been shown in the Berlin Film Festival, Jerusalem Film Festival, Montreal Film Festival, Hamptons Film Festival, Chicago Film Festival, Sheffield Doc/Fest, and many others. Tlalim's work has received scholarly attention by academics such as Omer Bartov and others.

Tlalim lived in London and taught at the National Film and Television School (NFTS).

== Biography ==
Asher Tlalim was born in Tangier in 1950 under the name of Mesod Bentolila to Ester and Jacob Bentolila. From Tangier, the family moved to Malaga, Spain. The family came to Israel in 1960 and settled in B’nei Brak, where he studied in a religious high-school. In 1968 Tlalim was drafted to the Golani Brigade of the army. He was stationed in the Sinai during the War of Attrition (1967-70) and later also took part in the Yom Kippur War (1973). Experiences from these wars served as the basis for his first films.

Tlalim lived in Jerusalem for many years. In 1998 he moved to London with his second wife, Ronit. He taught at the National Film and Television School (NFTS) whilst continuing to direct and produce films in the UK and Israel.

== Personal life and death ==
Tlalim married his first wife Miri (née: Phillip) in 1975. They have two children: Tom Carlos and Annael. In 1993 Tlalim married his second wife, Ronit Yoeli-Tlalim and had two more children: Avigail and Jonathan. Tom Carlos is named after his uncle Carlos (Chalom) Bentolila, Asher's younger brother, who was killed in 1973 in the Yom Kippur War. Tom Tlalim is an artist, musician and scholar. Anael Zimmerman (née Tlalim) is a speech therapist. Avigail Tlalim is an actor and theatre director.

Tlalim died from cancer in London, on 21 October 2022, at the age of 72.

== Filmography ==
=== As director ===
- 2021 – Make Me A King (Short Fiction) (associate producer) (pre-production)
- 2021 – Hold My Hand (Short Fiction) (associate producer) (post-production)
- 2020 – Woman of Valour (Short Fiction) (associate producer) (post-production)
- 2020 – The Schnoz (Short Fiction) (associate producer)
- 2019 – On the Beaches (Short Fiction) (associate producer)
- 2019 – Home (Short Animation) (associate producer)
- 2019 – Starboy (Short Fiction) (associate producer)
- 2017 – The Master of York (Short Fiction) (associate producer)
- 2017 – The Outer Circle (Short Fiction) (associate producer)
- 2016 – Mordechai (Short Fiction) (associate producer)
- 2015 – The Chop (Short Fiction) (associate producer)
- 2015 – The Guitar (Short Fiction) (associate producer)
- 2015 – samuel-613 (Short Fiction) (associate producer) Nominated for BAFTA
- 2012 – Hannah Cohen Holy's Communion (Short Fiction)(associate producer)
- 2010 – WITHOUT A HOME, documentary 100min (screenwriter, director & editor)
- 2003 – GALOOT (Exile In Hebrew) documentary 100min (screenwriter, director, editor & co-producer)
- 1999 – MY YIDDISHE MAMA’S DREAM documentary (screenwriter, director & editor)
- 1999 – SOUNDS IN SEARCH OF A HOME documentary 60min (screenwriter, director & editor)
- 1998 – HITCHHIKERS fiction 60min (director & editor)
- 1998 – SHALOM HAVER documentary 60min (screenwriter, director & editor)
- 1998 – BETWEEN THE CAROB AND THE OLIVE TREE doc 60min (screenwriter, director & editor)
- 1994 – DON’T TOUCH MY HOLOCAUST Al Tigu Le B'Shoah 150min documentary (Screenwriter, director & editor)
- 1994 – YATZEK BE HIRIYA fiction (Short; screenwriter, director & editor)
- 1994 – YOM EHAD HALEV NIFTAH, 60min documentary (screenwriter, director & editor)
- 1993 – HAKIVUN YERUSALAYIM, 60min documentary (screenwriter, director & editor)
- 1992–1993 – A PEOPLE AND ITS MUSIC: THE JEWISH MUSIC HERITAGE LIBRARY (10 chapter series; screenwriter, director & editor)
- 1991 – TIME OF THE CAMEL, 100min fiction (screenwriter, director, editor & co- producer)
- 1989–1990 – ALL THE LONELY PEOPLE, 150 min documentary (screenwriter, director & editor), a trilogy about immigration, rock and maturing: FRIENDS WITHOUT FRIENDS, with ‘Natasha’s Friends’; TRANSPARENT, with Albert Amar and CLOSE BY, with Ehud Banay
- 1988 – THE MISSING PICTURE, 30min documentary (screenwriter, director & editor)
- 1987 – THE BATTLE OVER THE HERMON, 60min documentary (screenwriter, director & editor)
- 1986 – THE LAST NOMAD, (screenwriter, director & editor)
- 1984 – A DAY IN A DIARY (screenwriter, director & editor)
- 1982–1983 – ENCOUNTER IN THE DESERT, fiction, 240 min (screenwriter, director & editor)
- 1981 – HOLOCAUST AND REVOLT, 60 min documentary (director & editor)
- 1980 – EMEK HABAHA / THE VALLEY OF TEARS, 50 min doc (screenwriter, co-director & editor)
- 1978 – JERUSALEM 24/4/74, 60min fiction (producer, screenwriter, director & editor)
- 1977 – THE LAST OF THE MOHICANS, 17min documentary (screenwriter, director & editor)
- 1977 – IT’S ALL MY FUN, 17min fiction (screenwriter, director & editor)

=== Children DVDs ===
- 1997 – EPHROHIM, 45min fiction/musical (Screenwriter, director & editor)
- 1996 – HOLCHIM LAGAN, 50min fiction/musical (Screenwriter, director & editor)
- 1995 – BA LI MESIBA LI, 50min fiction/musical (Screenwriter, director & editor)
- 1995 – YELEDISH IN THE CIRCUS, 60min, fiction (Screenwriter, director & editor)
- 1994 – A SMALL WORLD, 50min fiction/musical
- 1994 – YELEDISH, 50min fiction/musical (screenwriter, director & editor)
- 1993 – DIG DIG DUG 3, 60min fiction/musical (screenwriter, director & editor)
- 1992 – OD DIG DIG DUG, 60min, (screenwriter, director & editor)
- 1992 – DIG DIG DUG, 60min, (screenwriter, director & editor)
