= Drusilla Beyfus =

British etiquette writer (1927–2026)

- Born: 1 March 1927; Hampstead, London, England
- Died: 26 February 2026 (aged 98); London, England
- Occupation: Etiquette writer
- Employers: Central Saint Martin’s College of Art and Design; Reading Mercury; Berkshire Chronicle; Daily Express
- Spouse: Milton Shulman (m. 1956; died 2004)
- Children: Alexandra Shulman; Nicola Shulman; Jason Shulman
- Parents: Norman Beyfus; Florence Noel Barker

Drusilla Norman Beyfus (later Shulman; 1 March 1927 – 26 February 2026) was an English journalist and etiquette writer who was best known for her books on modern modes and manners.

== Background ==
Beyfus was born in Hampstead, London, England on 1 March 1927. She was educated at a private boarding school then attended finishing school as a young woman.

She met the journalist, war historian and theatre critic Milton Shulman in 1951. After a long courtship, interrupted by her sojourn in America as an author and freelance writer, they married at Caxton Hall in Westminster, London, on 6 June 1956. They had three children, who grew up in Belgravia in Greater London:

- Alexandra Shulman (born 1957), a journalist and the editor of British Vogue.
- Nicola Shulman (born 1960), a model, biographer and the wife of Constantine Phipps, 5th Marquess of Normanby.
- Jason Shulman (born 1963), a photographer, sculptor and magazine art director.

Beyfus was widowed in 2004. She died at home in London, on 26 February 2026, three days before her 99th birthday.

== Career ==
After leaving finishing school, Beyfus began her writing career writing women's columns at the Reading Mercury and the Berkshire Chronicle. As a young journalist, 19 year old Beyfus was sent to Berlin in 1948 by the Daily Express to cover the Berlin blockade. In the 1960s, she contributed a chapter to Len Deighton's London Dossier, a guide book to modern London. She was later a features editor at Vogue.

As an etiquette writer, Beyfus contributed to over 60 different magazines and published books on the topics of modes and manners. Her books were issued and reissued in multiple editions from 1956 to 1996, showing how what was considered good manners and proper behavior changed over the decades and generaions.

Beyfus was also once a senior tutor at Central Saint Martin's College of Art and Design.

== Publications (selected) ==
- 1968: The English Marriage: what it is like to be married today
- 1969: Lady Behave: a guide to modern manners for the 1970s (with Anne Edwards)
- 1985: The Bride's Book
- 1992: Courtship – The Done Thing: modern manners in miniature
- 1992: Modern Manners: the essential guide to living in the '90s
- 1992: Parties – The Done Thing: modern manners in miniature
- 1993: Business: The Done Thing
- 1993: Sex: The Done Thing
- 1994: Modern Manners: the complete guide to contemporary etiquette
- 2015: Vogue on Hubert de Givenchy
