= Galoot =

2003 documentary about the Israeli-Palestinian conflict

- Directed by: Asher Tlalim
- Written by: Asher Tlalim
- Produced by: Uri Fruchtmann
- Release date: 2003
- Running time: 152 minutes
- Countries: Israel, England, Germany

Galoot is a 2003 Israeli documentary that explores the Israeli–Palestinian conflict from the perspective of Palestinian refugees and new immigrants to Israel. It includes scenes in London, Israel, Morocco and Poland. The film stars Dr Tim Hunt, 2001 recipient of the Nobel Prize in Medicine.
