= Paul Spike =

American author, editor in chief and journalist

- Born: Paul Robert Spike; August 3, 1947 (age 79); Newark, Ohio, U.S.
- Education: Columbia University, University of Oxford
- Occupations: Writer, editor, journalist
- Spouses: Maureen Freely (divorced) Alexandra Shulman (divorced)
- Father: Robert W. Spike

Paul Robert Spike is an American author, editor in chief and journalist. He is best known as the author of the 1973 autobiography Photographs of My Father about the murder of his father, civil rights leader Robert W. Spike, in 1966.

== Career ==
Spike is the author of five books. His memoir Photographs of My Father (Knopf, 1973), written when he was 22, was named one of the books of the year by The New York Times.

His four other works include a collection of short stories, two political thrillers, and the cult novelization of Terry Gilliam's Jabberwocky, which Spike composed under the pseudonym "Ralph Hoover".

Spike's journalism has appeared in publications including The Village Voice, The Sunday Times, The Daily Telegraph, GQ and The Times Literary Supplement. He was a contributing editor at British Vogue between 1989 and 2017, and its restaurant critic for seven of those years.

In 1997, Spike became the first American editor of the 150-year-old British humour magazine Punch, which he relaunched as a weekly investigative and satirical gadfly, but soon fell out with its owner, Mohamed Al-Fayed.

Shortly afterwards, he became the Diary editor of The Independent, where he wrote a daily column.

== Honors ==
In 1970 Spike received the John Train Humor Prize awarded by The Paris Review. He was awarded a Literature Fellowship by the National Endowment for the Arts in 1974.

== Personal ==
Spike graduated from Columbia University in 1970. He later undertook postgraduate studies at St Catherine's College, Oxford. Between 1982 and 1984, he was a Visiting Distinguished Professor of Creative Writing at University of Texas at El Paso.

He has a son and a daughter by novelist Maureen Freely, and a son by British Vogue editor Alexandra Shulman, both former wives.

Having grown up in Greenwich Village, he moved to London in 1976.

== Bibliography ==
- Bad News (short fiction), Holt Rinehart and Winston, 1971.
- Photographs of My Father (autobiography), Knopf, 1973.
- Jabberwocky (as "Ralph Hoover"), Pan Books, 1976.
- The Night Letter (novel), GP Putnams, 1978.
- Last Rites (novel), New American Library, 1980.
