= Constantine Phipps, 5th Marquess of Normanby =

British peer, writer, and entrepreneur

The Most Honourable The Marquess of Normanby

Member of the House of Lords
- Lord Temporal
- as a hereditary peer 30 January 1994 – 11 November 1999
- Preceded by: The 4th Marquess of Normanby
- Succeeded by: Seat abolished (Note: Under the House of Lords Act 1999.)

Personal details
- Born: 24 February 1954 (age 72)
- Spouse(s): Sophie McCormick; Nicola Shulman
- Children: 4
- Parent(s): The 4th Marquess of Normanby; Grania Guinness
- Education: Eton College
- Alma mater: Worcester College, Oxford (BA); City University London
- Occupation: Landowner, novelist, poet

Constantine Edmund Walter Phipps, 5th Marquess of Normanby (born 24 February 1954), is a British peer, novelist, poet, and entrepreneur.

== Early life and education ==
Lord Normanby is the son of Oswald Phipps, 4th Marquess of Normanby and the Hon. Grania Guinness, a member of the Guinness brewing family and a daughter of Walter Guinness, 1st Baron Moyne. He was educated at Eton, Worcester College, Oxford, and City University of London.

He succeeded to the marquessate and other titles upon the death of his father in 1994 and entered the House of Lords as a crossbencher. He lost his seat under the House of Lords Act 1999.

Normanby lives in London and at Mulgrave Castle.

== Business interests ==
Normanby is the owner of the Mulgrave Estate and Mulgrave Castle, near Whitby, North Yorkshire. He is the founder of Mulgrave Properties LLP, a residential developer in Yorkshire. His indirect wealth includes a sizeable interest in property in West Vancouver, Canada, via British Pacific Properties Ltd of which he is a director. In 1998, he sold the 11,000-acre (45 km^{2}) Warter Priory estate, near Pocklington, East Riding of Yorkshire, to businessman Malcolm Healey for a reported £48 million.

== Philanthropy ==
Lord Normanby is chairman of the Normanby Charitable Trust which has a North Yorkshire focus. The trust has also supported Trinity College, Dublin, and Oxford University.

== Marriage and children ==
Before he was married, Normanby had a daughter with Sophie McCormick:

- Pandora McCormick (born 12 December 1984), an actress.

In 1990, Normanby married the journalist and author Nicola Shulman, daughter of theatre critic Milton Shulman and sister of British Vogue editor Alexandra Shulman. They have three children:

- Lady Sibylla Victoria Evelyn Phipps (born 6 August 1992)
- John Samuel Constantine Phipps, Earl of Mulgrave (born 26 November 1994), heir apparent to the marquessate and other titles.
- Lord Thomas Henry Winston Phipps (born 3 June 1997)

== Publications ==
Normanby is the author of three novels under the name Constantine Phipps: Careful with the Sharks (1985), Among the Thin Ghosts (1989), and What You Want (2014).

== Notes ==
Peerage of the United Kingdom
Preceded by Oswald Phipps	Marquess of Normanby; 1994–present	Incumbent; Heir apparent: John Phipps, Earl of Mulgrave
Orders of precedence in the United Kingdom
Preceded by The Marquess of Ailsa	Gentlemen	Followed by The Marquess of Abergavenny
