= John Sauven =

English economist and environmentalist

John Sauven (born in Ealing, west London, on 6 September 1954) is a British environmentalist who was executive director of Greenpeace's UK division from 2008 to 2022, and previously responsible for Greenpeace's communications. Sauven started working in a temporary position for Greenpeace in 1991 while waiting for a place at teacher's training college. As director, Sauven has helped to shape Greenpeace UK's commitment to defend the natural world and promote peace by investigating, exposing and confronting environmental abuse, and championing environmentally responsible solutions.

== Education ==
John Sauven was educated at St Benedict's School, Ealing and graduated from the University of Cardiff with a BSc (Econ).

== Career ==
Sauven helped to develop Greenpeace's "Greenfreeze" campaign (greenfreeze technology is now a global refrigeration industry standard utilising isobutane and propane as refrigerants and cyclopentane for producing the insulating foam) to protect the ozone layer from disappearing because of our use of CFCs and other ozone layer destroying chemicals. John also famously bought a plot of land in the path of the proposed Heathrow third runway.

Currently he is helping to strategise action-led, non-violent initiatives to save the North Pole from Big Oil. Sauven advocates urgent action to protect the area of sea ice around the North Pole, which is currently not national territory, by designating the area a 'global commons', collectively owned by humanity under the auspices of the United Nations."

In specialising on solutions and working with business, Sauven is conscious that Greenpeace's ongoing work may win fewer headlines, but the effort to evolve new, more sustainable business models is where the future will be won or lost. This is particularly the case with climate change where cleaner, more efficient products, processes and ways of producing energy need to be brought to market by government regulation and company innovation.

As well as his work with Greenpeace, Sauven has edited Sanity, the magazine of the Campaign for Nuclear Disarmament, CND.

Sauven has collaborated on several award winning films with film director Julien Temple and film producer Eski Thomas, commissioning The Ancient Forests to which Sir David Attenborough, Ewan McGregor and Andy Serkis lent their talents.

In 2012, John became a board member of Videre Est Credere (Latin for "to see is to believe") a UK Human Rights Charity. Videre describes itself as "give[ing] local activists the equipment, training and support needed to safely capture compelling video evidence of human rights violations. This captured footage is verified, analysed and then distributed to those who can create change." He participates alongside movie producers Uri Fruchtmann, Terry Gilliam and music producer Brian Eno.

== Personal ==
Sauven lives in Crouch End, north London, and is married to Janet Convery, a campaigner at the charity Action Aid. He has two sons.
