= Laura Marks =

British social activist (born 1960)

Laura Marks CBE
- Born: 26 April 1960 (age 66); London, UK
- Spouse: Dan Patterson
- Children: 3

Laura Elizabeth Marks CBE (born 26 April 1960) is an inter-faith social activist, policy adviser, writer and media commentator. Marks has founded and chaired social organisations including the Women's Faith Forum, Nisa-Nashim, Mitzvah Day International and the Holocaust Memorial Day Trust.

== Early life and career ==
Marks was raised in North-West London, attending South Hampstead High School and Haberdashers' Aske's School for Girls. Her family were members of Elstree and District Reform Synagogue and Marks was a member of the youth group Habonim Dror. She graduated from University College London before training as a teacher at the UCL Institute of Education. Marks later undertook a Commonwealth Scholarship to Canada for an M.Ed. Marks joined Abbott Mead Vickers BBDO in 1987, becoming planning director. In 1997, Marks left AMV BBDO to start her own planning consultancy. Between 1994 and 1998, Marks also served as chair of the Association of Qualitative Research Practitioners.

== Mitzvah Day ==
In 2005, Marks founded Mitzvah Day International, an annual day of faith-based social action that takes place in November each year. Marks has said that the inspiration for Mitzvah Day International came after she was asked to sing in an old people's home while living in Los Angeles. Since its establishment, Mitzvah Day International has both become the UK's largest faith-led day of social action and spread to numerous cities internationally with over 40,000 participants now taking part worldwide each year.

== The Women's Faith Forum ==
In 2020, Marks founded the Women's Faith Forum alongside women from each of the major faith groups. The Forum was founded with aim of bringing faith communities together to explore major societal issues through a female and community lens, with key areas of interest including: hate crime, food poverty, isolation and climate change.

To engage directly with policymakers, the WFF launched in the UK Parliament in 2024. The group's first event was held in March 2024 and explored the gendered impact of antisemitism and Islamophobia across the UK. It was addressed by the then Shadow Home Secretary Yvette Cooper, who said that women’s interfaith work was “more important than ever”.

== Other causes ==
In 2011, Marks founded and chaired the Commission on Women in Jewish Leadership and in 2020 relaunched the independent Alliance of Jewish Women and their Organisations. She is a trustee of both the Jewish Leadership Council and the Commonwealth Jewish Council. Between 2012 and 2015, Marks served as the Elected Senior Vice President of the Board of Deputies of British Jews.

In 2016, Marks became Chair of the Holocaust Memorial Day Trust, a UK charity that supports and promotes Holocaust Memorial Day by working to educate people about the dangers of hatred.

In 2017, Marks co-founded Nisa-Nashim, a national Jewish Muslim women's network that works to connect the Jewish and Muslim communities by empowering women. As of early 2020, Nisa-Nashim has 26 local UK groups and is the fastest growing initiative between the Jewish and Muslim communities in Europe. Marks’ other inter-faith work with the Muslim community includes involvement with Sadaqa Day. She regularly speaks at interfaith events including the New Horizons Conference. In 2019, Marks was appointed to the Mayor of London's Equalities Diversity and Inclusion committee.

== Media engagement ==
Marks sits on the board of the Jewish News. She is a regular media commentator, contributing to platforms including BBC Radio 2 Pause for Thought, BBC Breakfast, BBC London News, HuffPost, Evening Standard, The Jewish Chronicle, Jewish News, The Times of Israel and the Ham & High.

== Honours ==
Marks was appointed Officer of the Order of the British Empire (OBE) in the 2015 New Year Honours for services to interfaith relations. In the same year, The Jewish Chronicle named her one of the ten most influential British Jews in "The JC Power 100". She was awarded the Archbishop of Canterbury's Hubert Walter Award for Reconciliation and Interfaith Cooperation in 2019.

She was appointed Commander of the Order of the British Empire (CBE) in the 2023 Birthday Honours for services to inter-faith relations, Holocaust education and commemoration, and women's empowerment.

== Personal life ==
Marks is married to Dan Patterson, a television producer. They have three children and live in Primrose Hill, London. She is a member of North Western Reform Synagogue.

== Publications ==
In 2000, Marks published a book focussed on the application of qualitative research.
