= Tali Lennox =

British model and artist

- Born: Tali Lennox Fruchtmann; 9 February 1993 (age 33); Westminster, London, England
- Occupations: Model; artist
- Parents: Uri Fruchtmann (father); Annie Lennox (mother)
- Relatives: Lola Lennox (sister)
- Modelling information
- Height: 5 ft 10 in (1.78 m)
- Hair colour: Light brown
- Eye colour: Green
- Agency: The Lions (New York, Los Angeles); Next Model Management (Paris); Sight Management Studio (Barcelona); Modelwerk (Hamburg)

Tali Lennox Fruchtmann (born 9 February 1993) is a British and Israeli model and artist, formerly the brand promotional face for Topshop and Burberry and appeared in Deadman's Barstool (2018), The Street Kids Project and the first season of Britain's Next Top Model (2005). As of 2014, she reduced her modelling focus and became a portrait painter. She is the daughter of Scottish singer Annie Lennox and Israeli record producer Uri Fruchtmann, and sister of Lola Lennox.

== Career ==
In spring 2011, she appeared in various fashion houses, including Acne Studios, Christopher Kane, Prada and Miu Miu. In September 2012, she moved to New York City, where she took acting classes in the winter of 2013 with Susan Batson as her teacher.

== Personal life ==
Lennox's longtime boyfriend was American artist and model Ian Jones. On 8 August 2015, Lennox and Jones were kayaking on the Hudson River in the U.S. when their dual kayak capsized. Lennox was rescued by strangers on a passing boat, but Jones could not be found. After a two-day search, Jones' body was found. His cause of death was found to be accidental and "consistent with drowning." Jones's funeral was held on 17 August in his home state of Pennsylvania and attended by Tali, her mother Annie and her sister Lola.
