= Jake Wallis Simons =

English journalist & novelist (born 1978/79)

- Born: Jacob Timothy Wallis Simons; 1978 or 1979 (age 47–48)
- Education: St Peter's College, Oxford; University of East Anglia
- Occupations: Journalist and novelist
- Website: jakewallissimons.com

Dr Jacob Timothy Wallis Simons (born December 1978) is an English columnist, broadcaster and foreign correspondent. He was editor of The Jewish Chronicle from December 2021 to January 2025.

== Early life ==
Jake Wallis Simons was born in London to a Scottish-Jewish mother and an English father. His parents divorced when Jake was five. His mother sent him to CofE nursery school, followed by a year at Akiva (Reform), then an Orthodox school in Stamford Hill, commuting from Finchley. He took a first in English from St Peter's College, Oxford. In 2009, he gained a PhD in creative writing at the University of East Anglia.

== Career ==
Simons has been a freelance features writer for the Times and a broadcaster for BBC Radio 4, presenting documentaries and appearing on From Our Own Correspondent. He then joined the Sunday Telegraph, leaving to become Associate Global Editor at the Daily Mail.

He was appointed editor of The Jewish Chronicle in December 2021, succeeding Stephen Pollard. In January 2025, he stepped down from the role to focus on writing books. He writes a regular column for The Telegraph and his work also features frequently in the Spectator, the New York Post, and The Jewish Chronicle. He maintains an online newsletter.

He participated in the team which won a Webby award and a European Newspapers Award for the 2014 multimedia project for the Telegraph entitled Meet the Settlers about Israeli settlements in the West Bank.

His four novels include The English German Girl about a 1930s Jewish refugee, which was included in the Fiction Uncovered promotion for writers 'who deserve wider recognition' in 2011. His book Israelophobia, a work criticising anti-Zionism, was published in 2023.

Media offices
Preceded by Stephen Pollard	Editor of The Jewish Chronicle; 2021–2025	Succeeded by Daniel Schwammenthal
