= Detroit Industrial Mission =

Organization

The Detroit Industrial Mission was formed to address the quality of life of industrial workers in Detroit, Michigan. Existing between 1956 and 1978, it was a Christian ecumenical organization that offered workers the opportunity to enhance the meaning of work by fostering "human good between the work experience and theological ideas of men, industry, and the religious tradition." Participants included all types of churches and industries, endeavoring to involve both management and laborers in exploring the intersection of work and Christianity.
