= Alexandra Shulman =

British journalist

Alexandra Shulman CBE
- Born: 13 November 1957 (age 68); Hammersmith, London, England
- Education: St Paul's Girls' School
- Alma mater: University of Sussex
- Occupations: Fashion journalist, magazine editor, columnist, novelist
- Known for: Former Editor-in-Chief, British Vogue
- Spouse: Paul Spike (m. 1994; div. 2005)
- Children: 1
- Parents: Milton Shulman (father); Drusilla Beyfus (mother)
- Relatives: Jason Shulman (brother); Nicola Shulman (sister)
- Website: https://www.alexandrashulman.com/

Alexandra Shulman CBE (born 13 November 1957) is a British journalist. She is a former editor-in-chief of British Vogue, and became the longest serving editor in the history of the publication. After assuming the role in 1992, she presided over a circulation increase to 200,000. Shulman is reputedly one of the country's most quoted people on fashion trends. Shulman has written columns for The Daily Telegraph and the Daily Mail, as well as a novel.

== Early life ==
Alexandra Shulman was born in 1957, the daughter of the critic Milton Shulman and the writer Drusilla Beyfus, who herself was a contributor to Vogue, among other publications. Her parents had two additional children, Nicola and Jason. Her sister Nicola married Constantine Phipps (later, the 5th Marquess of Normanby) in 1990 and has written a biography of Tudor poet Sir Thomas Wyatt. Her brother Jason was formerly an art director for glossy magazines but is now a sculptor and photographer.

While Alexandra was growing up, the Shulman family lived in Belgravia and she attended St Paul's Girls' School. The thought of following her parents' career paths did not appeal to Shulman. Instead, she expressed an interest in becoming a hairdresser, or working in the music industry, saying: "Nobody believes me when I say it's not what I thought I was going to do. But my heroines were singers like Joni Mitchell, Patti Smith or Carly Simon. I didn't think about whether they wore Chanel or not".

Shulman studied social anthropology at the University of Sussex. In 1980, she graduated, receiving a 2:2, later recalling herself being "in tears". In the following months, she became an assistant at an independent record label, enabling her to move out of her parents' flat. However, she was sacked after a short time. She then took on a role in the artists and repertoire department of Arista Records which also did not last very long. After this foray into the music business, she became a secretary at the now-closed Over 21 magazine.

== Career ==
Shulman began working at Condé Nast – Vogue's publisher – upon joining Tatler in 1982, under the editorship first of Tina Brown and later Mark Boxer. Shulman began working in fashion journalism at Tatler, working subsequently for The Sunday Telegraph, Vogue and the British edition of GQ, where she became editor in 1990.

As Shulman took on the role as editor-in-chief of Vogue in 1992, some speculated that she was not experienced enough for the role. Furthermore, others commented that her personal appearance did not conform to previous Vogue editors; as The New York Times observed: "The British press has made much of the fact that when it comes to personal wardrobe, Ms. Schulman [sic] could learn a thing or two from Ms. Tilberis's trademark Chanel, and that she could also become better acquainted with a hairbrush". It has been observed that it is still remarked upon that she doesn't "look" like an editor of Vogue.

Her tenure at Vogue included iconic issues of the magazine. Her December 1999 "Millennium Issue", possessing a simplistic page layout and a reflective, mirror-like cover – giving the illusion that its reader was on the front cover – became the highest selling issue of Vogue, with circulation of 241,001, including a newsstand sale of 142,399. A 1997 cover in memoriam of Diana, Princess of Wales was included in a poll deciding the UK's best ever magazine cover. As The Guardian observed, "Vogue stood out with a simple bare cover using a Patrick Demarchelier photograph of Diana in a red dress". The "Gold Issue," a December 2000 edition featured Kate Moss on the cover in silhouette.

"Somebody like Jennifer Aniston will only do an interview with copy approval and picture approval. I've never had anybody on the cover, ever, who's had copy approval and picture approval. I just don't think it's a proper thing if you do. It's this thing of people just basically treating you as if you're bound to be doing something that is in some way going to be insulting to their client. I just find that so offensive."

— Shulman, discussing her stance on copy approval.

As the editor of Vogue, Shulman made decisions on the magazine's stance. She stated: "we never publish diets. We've never published things on cosmetic surgery", adding that she does not want to prescribe as specific way a woman should look to the reader. She also refuses to put celebrities on the cover if they demand copy approval and picture approval, saying "I just find that so offensive".

The magazine drew criticism in the early 1990s for photos of a waifish Kate Moss that were dubbed "heroin chic", part of a larger ongoing debate over whether fashion magazines present an unhealthy image for girls and contribute to the anorexia problem. In 1997, the watchmaker Omega pulled an ad campaign from Vogue over this issue. Shulman dismissed these concerns in a 1998 interview with the PBS public affairs television programme Frontline, stating: "Not many people have actually said to me that they have looked at my magazine and decided to become anorexic."

She later became more sensitive to the issue acknowledging that anorexia is a "huge problem" in a January 2005 interview with The Scotsman: "I really wish that models were a bit bigger because then I wouldn't have to deal with this the whole time. There is pressure on them to stay thin, and I'm always talking to the designers about it, asking why they can't just be a bit closer to a real woman's physique in terms of their ideal, but they're not going to do it. Clothes look better to all of our eyes on people who are thinner". In 2009, Shulman spoke out over the sample sizes leading designers were producing – some were so small they restricted Vogue using the models they wished in the magazine, resulting in some models being airbrushed to look bigger. Shulman wrote to designers to draw their attention to the situation calling for larger sized samples to be produced.

Contrary to expectations, Shulman describes her own life as work-dominated and not particularly glamorous. In an October 2004 newspaper column on her Telegraph portrait, she said:

Leaving aside the obvious but unlikely criteria of beautiful and thin, I realised that there was no look that was achievable which was going to make me happy. In my mind I am a free spirit of about 25 wafting around in second-hand cocktail dresses; in reality I am a 47-year-old businesswoman and journalist. The pictures unfortunately, tell the whole story.

She was a regular columnist for The Daily Telegraph newspaper, but began writing a column for the Daily Mail in 2006, which ran until 2009, when she was replaced by Liz Jones. Shulman's first novel, Can We Still Be Friends?, was published by Fig Tree in 2012.

In 2010, Shulman was awarded an Honorary Master of Arts degree from the University for the Creative Arts.

In February 2013, she was assessed as one of the 100 most powerful women in the United Kingdom by Woman's Hour on BBC Radio 4.

Shulman was interviewed by Kirsty Young on Desert Island Discs on BBC Radio 4 in June 2013. In 2016, Shulman collaborated with photographer Josh Olins to shoot Catherine, Duchess of Cambridge on the cover of Vogue's centenary issue.

On 25 January 2017, approaching 25 years as editor-in-chief, it was announced that Shulman was leaving British Vogue in June 2017. Shulman stated: "last autumn I realised that I very much wanted to experience a different life and look forward to a future separate to Vogue". Shulman was succeeded as Editor of Vogue by Edward Enninful.

In 2018, she launched her personal website https://www.alexandrashulman.com/

Shulman is a Vice-President of The London Library.

In May 2020, Shulman was appointed as a strategic advisor to fast growing online fashion marketplace Atterley.com. Also in 2020 her memoir Clothes..And Other Things That Matter was published by Cassell.

== Personal life ==
She has a son, Samuel (born 6 April 1995), with the writer Paul Spike, whom she married on 26 May 1994. The couple divorced in 2005.

Shulman was appointed Officer of the Order of the British Empire in the 2005 New Year Honours for services to the magazine industry. She was later promoted to Commander of the Order of the British Empire in the 2018 New Year Honours for services to fashion journalism. She was twice named "Editors' Editor of the Year" by the British Society of Magazine Editors, in 2004 and 2017, and was formerly a trustee of the National Portrait Gallery.

Media offices
Preceded by Liz Tilberis	Editor of British Vogue; 1992–2017	Succeeded by Edward Enninful
