= Israelophobia =

2023 book by Jake Wallis Simons

Israelophobia: The Newest Version of the Oldest Hatred and What To Do About It
- Author: Jake Wallis Simons
- Language: English
- Subject: Anti-Zionism
- Genre: Polemic
- Publisher: Constable
- Publication date: September 7, 2023
- Publication place: United Kingdom
- Pages: 221
- ISBN: 978-1-40871-927-5
- Website: https://jakewallissimons.substack.com/p/israelophobia

Israelophobia: The Newest Version of the Oldest Hatred and What To Do About It is a polemical book written by British journalist Jake Wallis Simons and published in 2023 by Constable. The book argues against anti-Zionism and presents methods for combating it. In response to the October 7 attacks, a new foreword, titled "I told you so" was released.

== Background ==
Jake Wallis Simons is a British journalist and author who has been the editor of the London-based Jewish Chronicle since 2021.

== Synopsis ==
In the book, Simons argues that the State of Israel is a target of an antisemitic campaign of delegitimization, contends that anti-Zionism is merely a new incarnation of antisemitism, lists eight identifiers for antisemitism, and presents five methods for combating anti-Zionism.

== Reception ==
Reception

Review score
Publication	Score
The Daily Telegraph	4/5 stars

The book received four out of five stars by Con Coughlin, a defense editor for The Daily Telegraph. A review in the journal Israel Affairs by Roza El-Eini said that the book left "no doubt as to the full extent of the threat [Israelophobia] is to the Jewish people and to Israel." George Chesterton of the London Standard called the book "particularly timely," whereas Roger Boyes of The Times opined that it could have made a stronger argument against anti-Zionism. New Humanist writer Keith Kahn-Harris was more critical, describing the book as "an expression of angry, inert futility."

== See also ==
- New antisemitism
- Three Ds of antisemitism
