= Nicola Shulman =

British biographer, former model, and aristocrat

The Most Honourable The Marchioness of Normanby
- Born: 1960 (age 65–66)
- Education: Corpus Christi College, Oxford
- Occupation: Author
- Spouse(s): Edward St Aubyn (m. 1987; div. 1990) The 5th Marquess of Normanby (m. 1990)
- Children: 3
- Parents: Milton Shulman (father); Drusilla Beyfus (mother)
- Relatives: Jason Shulman (brother); Alexandra Shulman (sister)

Nicola Shulman Phipps, Marchioness of Normanby (born 1960), is a British biographer, former model, and aristocrat. After her marriage in 1990, she initially became Countess of Mulgrave (a courtesy title) and since 1994 she has been known as Nicola Phipps, Marchioness of Normanby.

== Early life ==
Nicola Shulman was born into a Jewish family, the daughter of Milton Shulman, the former theatre reviewer for the London Evening Standard, and Drusilla Beyfus, an author of etiquette books. Her brother, Jason Shulman, is an artist, while her sister, Alexandra Shulman, is the former editor in chief of British Vogue.

Shulman graduated from Corpus Christi College, Oxford.

== Career ==
Shulman started her career as a model. She later worked for Harpers & Queen. She is the author of two biographies. Her second book, Graven with Diamonds, was reviewed in The Daily Telegraph, The Guardian, The Times, The Sunday Times, and The Independent.

== Personal life ==
Shulman has been married twice. Her first husband was novelist Edward St Aubyn. After they divorced, she married Constantine Phipps, 5th Marquess of Normanby, whom she met at the Groucho Club.

They have three children:

- Lady Sibylla Victoria Evelyn Phipps (born 6 August 1992)
- John Samuel Constantine Phipps, Earl of Mulgrave (born 26 November 1994)
- Lord Thomas Henry Winston Phipps (born 3 June 1997)

== Works ==
- Shulman, Nicola (2004). A Rage for Rock Gardening: The Story of Reginald Farrer Gardener, Writer & Plant Collector. Boston, Massachusetts: D.R. Godine. ISBN 9781567922493. OCLC 55887404.
- Shulman, Nicola (2011). Graven with Diamonds: The Many Lives of Thomas Wyatt: Courtier, Poet, Assassin, Spy. London, U.K.: Short Books. ISBN 9781906021115. OCLC 694269919.
