= Uri Fruchtmann =

Israeli human rights activist, film producer and director

- אורי פרוכטמן
- Born: 1955 (age 70–71)
- Occupations: Human rights activist; film producer; director
- Spouse: Annie Lennox (m. 1988; div. 2000)
- Children: Lola Lennox; Tali Lennox

Uri Fruchtmann (Hebrew: אורי פרוכטמן; born 1955) is an Israeli human rights activist, film producer, and director.

== Career ==
He serves as the non-executive director of Ealing Studios and co-founder of Fragile Films, an independent film production company based in the United Kingdom.

=== Board memberships ===
Fruchtmann has served on the boards of several charities. In 2008 he co-founded the UK human rights charity Videre Est Credere (Latin for "To see is to believe"). Videre describes itself as "give[ing] local activists the equipment, training and support needed to safely capture compelling video evidence of human rights violations. This captured footage is verified, analysed and then distributed to those who can create change." Fruchtmann is currently the Chairman of the Board along with film-maker Terry Gilliam, Executive Director of Greenpeace UK John Sauven and music producer Brian Eno.

== Personal life ==
Fruchtmann was Scottish singer Annie Lennox's second husband. They have two daughters, Lola and Tali. A son, Daniel, was stillborn in 1988.

== Filmography ==
=== As a producer ===
- One Family: The Price of Bread (TV documentary, 1991).
- Obi (1991).
- All in the Family (1992).
- Stir it up (1994).
- The Atlantic Records Story (1994).
- Spice World (1997).
- An Ideal Husband (1999).
- High Heels and Low Lifes (2001).
- The Importance of Being Earnest (2002).
- Galoot (documentary, 2003).
- Hope Springs (2003).
- Grasp the Nettle (documentary, 2013).
- Tawai (documentary, 2017).

=== As a director ===
- Stir it up (1994).
- The Atlantic Records Story (1994).
