= Videre =

UK human rights organization

Videre est Credere (Videre) is a British human rights organisation that equips communities in hard-to-access areas with cameras, technology, and training to safely and effectively collect video evidence to expose violence, human rights violations, and other systemic abuses. The organisation's name means "to see is to believe" in Latin. It is registered as a charitable organisation in London, England. Videre has trained over 500 activists since its founding in 2008.

== Methodology ==
Videre est Credere (Videre) works in some of the world's most oppressive societies and situations. It creates a global network of activists able to film and document the abuses and human rights violations of violent regimes. Videre employs a four-part methodology in its work:

- Engage local communities: Videre works with local communities and activists in hard-to-reach places to determine which visuals are not being shown.
- Equip and train local activists: It provides activists with cameras—including hidden cameras when necessary—and extensive security training to film violations in a safe way.
- Verify the images: Videre verifies the footage that its activists capture via multiple means.
- Distribute strategically: Videre works to understand the situation on the ground; who influences the situation; and which avenues of distribution will achieve the change that the local communities want to see.

The organisation rarely takes public credit for its work, but its footage has been published in a variety of media outlets; shown to policymakers; formed the basis for NGO advocacy work; and used as evidence in courts. Its footage is processed, categorised and stored in an electronic archive that allows Videre to use the footage in both short-term and long-term.

The organisation uses a number of tools used by commercial or intelligence organisations, including social network analysis software. It also claims to use a number of techniques unusual to the NGO industry such as "data storage and communication encryption to counter-surveillance."

== History ==
Videre was founded by CEO Oren Yakobovich and Board Chairman Uri Fruchtmann in 2008. Fruchtmann, the former husband of musician Annie Lennox and a successful filmmaker, had the idea of giving old video equipment to human rights defenders. People told him he should talk to Yakobovich. Yakobovich was leading the Camera Documentation Project at the Israeli human rights organisation B'Tselem at the time and had the idea to take the idea behind the project global. The two partnered to establish Videre.

== People ==
Brian Eno is Videre's patron. Uri Fruchtmann, John Sauven, Katy Cronin, Fiona Napier and Terry Gilliam serve on its board of trustees. The organisation is run by CEO Oren Yakobovich. In 2014, Yakobovich was named an Ashoka Fellow. Videre does not identify its current staff members but former staff are known to include: Nizan Weisman (who helped set up the organisation and its governance, served as Board of Directors member between the years 2008 and 2012, leading all financial issues, was Senior Partner in BDO Consulting), Eitan Diamond (who helped set up the organisation and was Executive Director of Gisha – Legal Centre for the Movement of People), Rory Byrne (the former Head of Security and Research and now CEO and co-founder of Security First), Holly Kilroy (the former Head of Development and now Head of Development and co-founder of Security First), and Liviu Babbitz (former Head of Operations and founder of CyborgNest).

== Budget ==
According to the UK Charity Commission, the organisation had an expenditure of £908,371 and income of £901,728 in 2013.
