= Lola Lennox =

British singer and songwriter

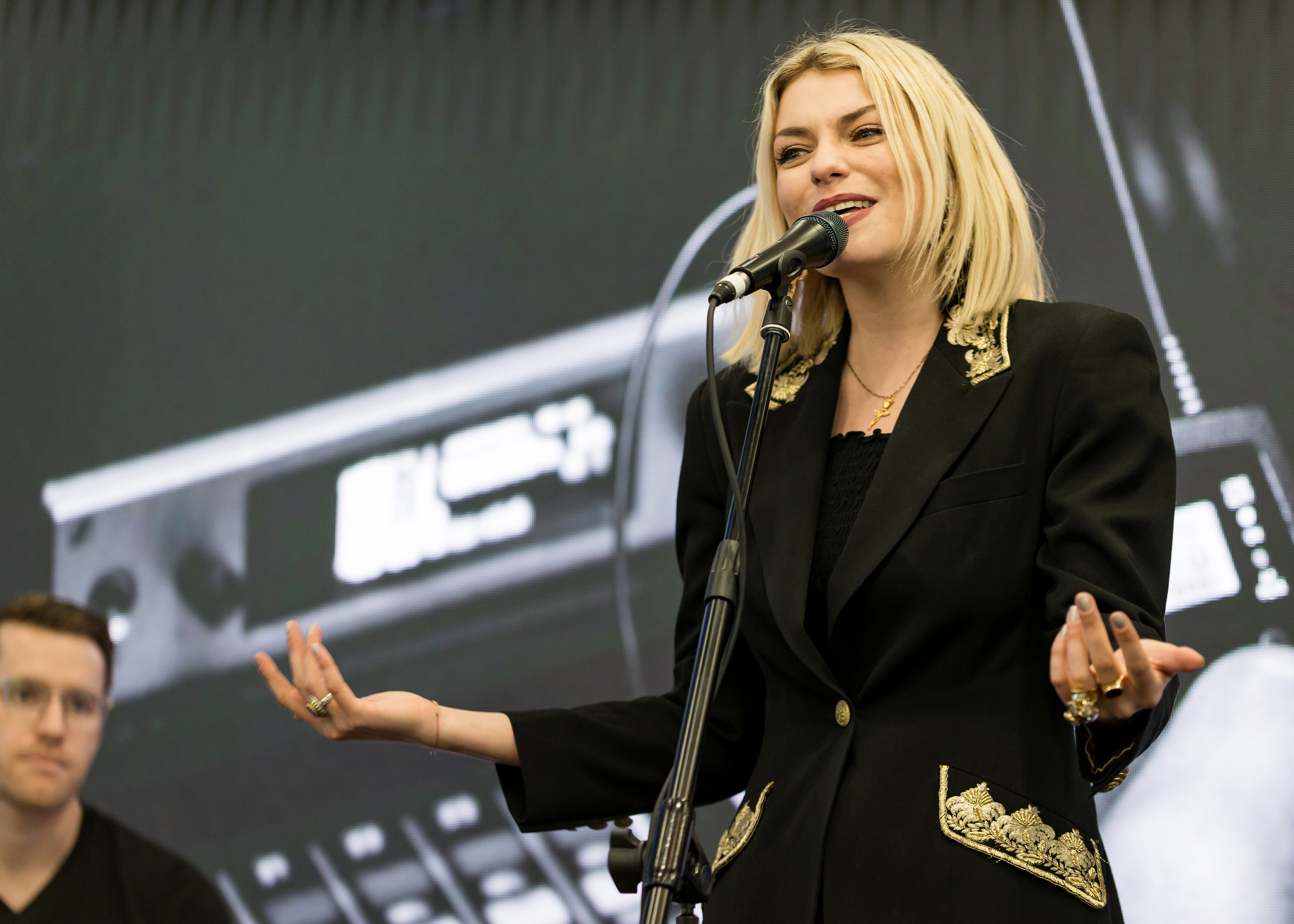
- Lola Lennox performing on stage in Anaheim, California in 2018

Background information
- Born: Lola Lennox Fruchtmann; 10 December 1990 (age 35)
- Origin: London, England
- Genres: Pop; rock
- Occupations: Singer; songwriter; musician; model
- Instruments: Vocals; piano
- Years active: 2014–present
- Label: AWAL
- Website: lolalennox.com

Lola Lennox Fruchtmann (born 10 December 1990) is a British and Israeli singer, songwriter, and model. She is the sister of British fashion model Tali Lennox, and daughter of Scottish singer Annie Lennox and Israeli film producer Uri Fruchtmann.

== Early life ==
Lola was born to Scottish singer and former Eurythmics lead vocalist Annie Lennox and Israeli film-producer Uri Fruchtmann in 1990. She started learning piano at age seven, and as a teenager would often sneak into her parents' basement to record songs she had written. She was raised in London, England, along with her sister Tali Lennox, before her parents' divorce in 2000. Her mother would later marry American doctor Mitch Besser in a private London ceremony in 2012, with the two daughters in attendance.

== Music career ==
After studying classical singing at the Royal Academy of London, Lola began her career in music. She signed with XIX Entertainment, hiring Simon Fuller as her manager. Lennox counts Dusty Springfield, Nina Simone, and Ella Fitzgerald as influences.

She first performed alongside Ciara at Vogue's Fashion Experience Dubai in October 2014. She first appeared live on television alongside her mother to perform vocals in the PBS concert special, Annie Lennox: Nostalgia in Concert in January 2015. In October 2017, she opened for Lukas Nelson & Promise of the Real, the band formed by the son of Willie Nelson. In 2019, Lennox sang and co-wrote songs for the soundtrack of the BBC/Discovery Channel docu-series Serengeti, including the show's opening title theme, with Goldfrapp's Will Gregory.

Lennox's debut single "In the Wild" was released through AWAL on February 7, 2020 alongside its accompanying music video, directed by Natalie Johns. Idolator called the track a "soaring ballad" that "showcases the Brit's powerful pipes and poetic pen... a most auspicious debut."

In April 2020, she performed a duet with her mother for the historic One World: Together at Home concert event organized by Global Citizen and curated by singer Lady Gaga, in support of the World Health Organization, singing a rendition of the Eurythmics track "There Must Be an Angel (Playing with My Heart)". This version of the song was later included on One World: Together at Home The Album, a compilation album featuring all performances from the event as individual tracks, and was made available on all major streaming platforms to raise funds.

Lennox's second single "Pale" was released April 17, 2020. The song "examines Lola’s own personal battle with grief over the tragic loss of a loved one", and was co-written with Andy Stochansky, produced by H. Scott Salinas, and co-produced by Annie Lennox. Sarah Rodman of Entertainment Weekly described it as a "vibrant piano ballad", naming it one of the "five best tracks of the week" upon its release. The accompanying video for "Pale" was shot entirely under quarantine by Lennox's boyfriend, Canadian model Braeden Wright, and was released on Vevo on May 27, 2020. Lennox's third single, "Back at Wrong" was released in July 2020.

== Modeling career ==
Lennox first appeared in Teen Vogue alongside sister Tali in 2008, and later, in Vanity Fair. She was featured in the Spring/Summer 2010 campaign for Topshop, and was signed to Next Management in London.

== Personal life ==
As of June 2020, Lennox lives in Los Angeles with her partner, Braeden Wright, a Canadian model. They became engaged in July 2023 and got married on June 24, 2025.

== Discography ==
=== Singles and EPs ===
- "In the Wild" (2020)
- "Pale" (2020)
- "Back at Wrong" (2020)
- "La La Love Me" (2020)
- "Wherever You Go" (2021)
- "Love Like That" (2021)
- "Want More" (2022)
- "Dreamer" (2023)
- Dreamer EP (2023)
