= Jason Shulman =

British sculptor and photographer

- Occupations: Sculptor, photographer
- Spouse: Susan Irvine
- Parent(s): Milton Shulman; Drusilla Beyfus
- Relatives: Alexandra Shulman (sister); Nicola Shulman (sister)

Jason Shulman is a British sculptor and photographer who lives and works in London.

== Early life ==
His father, the drama critic Milton Shulman, and mother, journalist Drusilla Beyfus, were married in 1956. They had three children: Alexandra, Nicola, and Jason. While Jason was growing up, the Shulman family lived in Belgravia.

== Career ==
Shulman worked as a graphic designer for The Sunday Telegraph and an art director for Harpers & Queen and Harvey Nichols' magazines.

Two years after quitting his job as an Art Director, Shulman had his first gallery show in 2006 at the Madder Rose gallery near London's Old Street. Ten of the pieces concerned the painkiller Solpadeine, and one piece in particular was made using his father's ashes in stratified, magnetised, colour-coded layers. Regarding the pills, Shulman remarked, "They're the ones that just about give you the strength to get out of the bath in the morning. I wanted to say thank you." In 2009, he participated in the Third Moscow Biennale of contemporary art. During the 2014 Sochi Winter Olympics, Shulman focused a camera on his television and took long exposure photos of the athletes in motion. Since most of what he recorded was short, he imagined what might happen if he shot longer stretches of action. In 2015, the artist presented himself (along with dogs, drinks, and vintage porn) at Soho's Door Gallery in a "secretive" installation.

In 2016 at the Cob Gallery, Shulman exhibited his Photographs of Films, a series of photographs which capture the entire duration of a movie (minus titles and credits) in a single exposure. Shulman spoke of the photographs: "There are roughly 130,000 frames in a 90 minute film and every frame of each film is recorded in these photographs. You could take all these frames and shuffle them like a deck of cards, and no matter the shuffle, you would end up with the same image I have arrived at. Essentially each of these photographs show the genetic code of the film."

== Personal life ==
He is married to writer Susan Irvine.
