= Milton Shulman =

Canadian author, film and theatre critic

- Born: 1 September 1913; Toronto, Ontario, Canada
- Died: 24 May 2004 (aged 90); London, England
- Occupations: Author, critic
- Spouse: Drusilla Beyfus (m. 1956)
- Children: Jason Shulman; Alexandra Shulman; Nicola Shulman

Milton Shulman (1 September 1913 – 24 May 2004) was a Canadian author, film and theatre critic who was based in the United Kingdom from 1943.

== Early life ==
Shulman was born in Toronto, Ontario, the son of a successful shopkeeper. His parents were born in Ukraine and were driven out of the Russian Empire by poverty and anti-Jewish pogroms. Shulman's father was only 26 when he died of the flu epidemic but had already acquired three millinery shops as well as a men's haberdashery.

Shulman was educated at Harbord Collegiate, then spent four years at the University of Toronto. Although, he wished to pursue a writing career, he was articled to a law firm, attending lectures at Osgoode Hall Law School for a further three years before being called to the Ontario bar just before World War II broke out in 1939.

== War service ==
After the period called the "phoney war", Shulman signed up for the Canadian army, was commissioned as a second lieutenant in the Canadian Armoured Corps and posted to England in June 1943. Stationed in London as a captain, he was assigned to the secret operational intelligence unit MI 14b, dealing with the order of battle of the Wehrmacht's formations.

He joined Canadian Army HQ three months before D-Day as a major and by the war's end he was an intelligence officer with the First Canadian Army. While still in uniform, he interviewed many of the captured German generals in the following months and years including Gerd von Rundstedt and Kurt Meyer. As a result of these interviews, he wrote the Second World War military history Defeat in the West, published in London by Secker & Warburg in April 1947, and by Dutton in New York in January 1948. A paperback edition remains in print.

== London career ==
Shulman joined the staff of the London Evening Standard in 1948 and, for over forty years, wrote about theatre, film, television and politics with sharp humour and irreverence. He was theatre critic for the Standard from 1953 until November 1991, and remained a weekly columnist until February 1996. He had initially become the Standard's film critic in 1948 and later became film critic for Vogue. For 18 years, he was a regular participant in BBC Radio 4's talk show Stop The Week.

During this time, he also wrote two novels, The Victors (Dell 1963) and Kill Three (Collins 1967); the Preep series of children's books; and two serious books on the impact of television, The Ravenous Eye (Cassel 1973) and The Least Worst Television in the World (Barrie and Jenkins 1973), as well as a 90-minute play for BBC 2 also called Kill Three from which the novel was adapted. (The Victors was unique in being a novelization of the Carl Foreman screenplay about American soldiers in WWII, which was itself based upon Alexander Baron's book of short stories about British WWII soldiers, The Human Kind. Baron declined to write the novelization himself, wanting it to have an authentic-sounding American voice and avoid retreading his own work; but nonetheless also wanted to select the novelist and maintain control over the project. As the book's copyright registration, assigned to Baron, particularizes, Baron engaged Shulman to write the novelization as a work for hire.)

Shulman and his fellow critic Herbert Kretzmer co-wrote the story for the film comedy Every Home Should Have One (1970); the screenplay derived from it was written by the film's star, Marty Feldman, along with Barry Took and Denis Norden; after which the material circled back to Shulman and Kretzmer who novelized the script—and as a movie tie-in edition, it was published in paperback by Hodder & Stoughton to coincide with the film's release.

Shulman received the IPA Award as Critic of the Year 1966. In 1956, he wrote a scathing review of a musical Wild Grows the Heather based on a J. M. Barrie play, The Little Minister. Directed by Ralph Reader, who also wrote the lyrics, it received an ovation on its first night but Shulman and other critics knew that this was because Reader had given out first night tickets to the boys taking part in one of his Boy Scout productions and told them to go along and give the piece a good reception. Among other things, Shulman said that the plot "moved at the pace of cold porridge going uphill."

In 1980, he was instrumental in setting up the London Theatre Associate awards for new and revived works undertaken by fringe, community based and touring companies.

In 1994, three years after Milton Shulman had retired from theatre reviewing, The Observer critic Michael Coveney published The Aisle is Full of Noises, a spirited "vivisection of the live theatre" which he arranged in the form of a diary, including some witty if not entirely flattering references to Shulman, while bracketing him with "the kosher butchers — Herbert Kretzmer, Bernard Levin and David Nathan".

Shulman took great offence, as reported in The Times newspaper diary of 21 September 1994: "Solicitors are trying to hammer out a deal to prevent court action against Nick Hern, the small publisher of the offending work. "I thought the comments were in the spirit of the book,' pleads Coveney. 'I rather regret that Milton, of whom I am actually rather fond, didn't take them in that spirit.' Shulman is tight-lipped, 'There are negotiations going on at the moment. I have not issued a writ for libel.'" The outcome was that the book was withdrawn from circulation but, according to Coveney speaking in October 2007, by then most of the copies had been sold.

== Family ==
Shulman married his first wife Joyce in Toronto in 1943, two months before he embarked on a troopship for England, and never saw her again. They were divorced in 1948.

He first met journalist Drusilla Beyfus (1927–2026) in 1951: "I had for months been meeting Drusilla in cocktail bars and restaurants. She was the most decorative aspect of the Daily Express, where her elegant figure, piquant face and ever-smiling personality were in constant demand by feature writers and columnists." After a long courtship, interrupted by her sojourn in America as an author and freelance writer, they married at Caxton Hall on 6 June 1956. There are three children of the marriage: Alexandra Shulman (born 1957), Nicola Shulman (born 1960) and Jason Shulman (born 1963). The family moved to Belgravia for some years after the birth of the children. He described his family as less a journalistic dynasty than "an epidemic".

He died in London, aged 90. His son Jason used some of his ashes in an artwork of stratified, magnetized, color-coded layers; this was shown in 2006 at the Madder Rose gallery near London's Old Street.

== Publications ==
- Defeat in the West, (Secker & Warburg, 1947; revised edition 1986) online
- How to be a Celebrity, with caricatures by Vicky, (Reinhardt & Evans, 1950)
- Carl Foreman's The Victors (Panther, 1963)
- Preep: The Little Pigeon of Trafalgar Square, with illustrations by Dale Maxey, (Random House, 1964; Collins, 1965)
- Preep in Paris, illustrations by Dale Maxey, (Collins, 1967)
- Kill 3 (Collins, 1967)
- Preep and the Queen, illustrations by Dale Maxey, (Collins, 1970)
- The Least Worst Television in the World (Barrie & Jenkins, 1973)
- Ravenous Eye: The Impact of the Fifth Factor (Cassell, 1973)
- Marilyn, Hitler and Me: The Memoirs of Milton Shulman (André Deutsch, 1998)
