= List of compositions by John Corigliano =

This is a list of compositions by John Corigliano sorted by genre, date of composition, title, and scoring.

Genre	Date	Title	Scoring	Notes
Opera	1991	The Ghosts of Versailles	for soloists, chorus and orchestra	in 2 acts; libretto by William M. Hoffman; Metropolitan Opera version (1991); Standard version (1995)
Film score	1980	Altered States		
Film score	1985	Revolution		winner of the 1986 BAFTA Anthony Asquith Award
Film score	1998	The Red Violin		winner of the 1999 Academy Award for Original Music Score
Orchestral	1965	Elegy	for orchestra	
Orchestral	1965	Tournaments	for orchestra	
Orchestral	1971, 1976	Voyage	for string orchestra	from L'Invitation au Voyage for a cappella chorus; arranged 1976
Orchestral	1972, 1974	Gazebo Dances	for orchestra	original version for piano 4-hands; orchestrated 1974
Orchestral	1972, 1974	Overture to the Imaginary Invalid from Gazebo Dances	for orchestra	original version for piano 4-hands; orchestrated 1974
Orchestral	1981	Promenade Overture	for orchestra	
Orchestral	1981	Ritual Dance	for orchestra	from the film score Altered States
Orchestral	1981	Three Hallucinations	for orchestra	based on the film score to Altered States
Orchestral	1985, 1986	Fantasia on an Ostinato	for orchestra	original version for piano solo; orchestrated 1986
Orchestral	1987	Campane di Ravello (Bells of Ravello), A Celebration Piece for Sir Georg Solti	for orchestra	
Orchestral	1988	Symphony No. 1	for orchestra	winner of the 1991 Grawemeyer Award for Music Composition winner of the 1992 Grammy Award for Best Classical Contemporary Composition movement III adapted as Of Rage and Remembrance
Orchestral	1994	To Music	for orchestra	
Orchestral	1997	DC Fanfare	for orchestra	
Orchestral	2000	Phantasmagoria, Suite from The Ghosts of Versailles	for orchestra	
Orchestral	2000	Symphony No. 2	for string orchestra	winner of the 2001 Pulitzer Prize for Music
Orchestral	2000	The Mannheim Rocket	for orchestra	
Orchestral	2004	Midsummer Fanfare	for orchestra	
Orchestral	2007	Jamestown Hymn	for orchestra	
Orchestral	2011	Lullaby for Natalie	for orchestra	orchestral arrangement of the original for violin and piano
Concertante	1968	Concerto	for piano and orchestra	
Concertante	1971, 1983	Voyage	for flute and string orchestra	from L'Invitation au Voyage for a cappella chorus; arranged 1983 also chamber versions for flute with piano, or harp, or string quintet
Concertante	1975	Concerto	for oboe and orchestra	
Concertante	1975	Aria	for oboe and string orchestra (or string quintet)	adapted from the Oboe Concerto: movement IV
Concertante	1977	Concerto	for clarinet and orchestra	
Concertante	1977, 1995	Soliloquy	for clarinet and orchestra	adapted from the Clarinet Concerto; also for clarinet and string quartet
Concertante	1982	Pied Piper Fantasy, Concerto	for flute and orchestra	
Concertante	1992–1993	Troubadours, Variations	for guitar and chamber orchestra	
Concertante	1997	The Red Violin: Chaconne	for violin and orchestra	also for violin and piano
Concertante	1999	The Red Violin, Suite	for violin and orchestra	
Concertante	2003	Concerto "The Red Violin"	for violin and orchestra	
Concertante	2007	Conjurer, Concerto	for percussionist and string orchestra with optional brass	Winner of the 2014 Grammy Award for Best Classical Instrumental Solo
Film score	2010	Edge of Darkness	rejected score, replacement score by Howard Shore	
Concertante	2020	Triathlon, Concerto	for saxophonist and orchestra	
Band	1965	Elegy	for wind ensemble	original version for orchestra; transcribed by Christopher Anderson (2012)
Band	1965	Tournaments	for wind ensemble	original version for orchestra; forthcoming transcription by Christopher Anderson (2013)
Band	1972, 1974	Gazebo Dances	for wind ensemble	original version for piano 4-hands; arranged 1974
Band	1988	Tarantella from Symphony No. 1	for wind ensemble	original version for orchestra; arranged by Jeff Gershman (2001)
Band	1997	DC Fanfare	for wind ensemble	original version for orchestra; arranged by Mark Spede (2001)
Band	2004	Circus Maximus, Symphony No. 3	for large wind ensemble	also calls for players in the balcony, and marching band which moves around the audience
Band	2011	Lullaby for Natalie	for wind ensemble	original version for violin and piano - based on orchestral version; arranged by Peter Stanley Martin under the supervision of the composer (2012)
Chamber music	1962–1963	Sonata	for violin and piano	winner of the 1964 Festival of Two Worlds prize for chamber music
Chamber music	1971, 1983	Voyage	for flute and piano, or harp, or string quintet	from L'Invitation au Voyage for a cappella chorus arranged for flute and piano by Mark Starr (1988) arranged for flute and harp by Valerie Vonpechy Whitcup (1988) arranged for flute and string quintet by Clare Hoffman (1988)
Chamber music	1972, 2003	A Black November Turkey	for 2 violins, viola and cello	original version for chorus; arranged 2003
Chamber music	1975	Scherzo	for oboe and percussion	adapted from the Oboe Concerto: movement III
Chamber music	1977	Soliloquy	for clarinet, 2 violins, viola and cello	adapted from the Clarinet Concerto; also for clarinet and orchestra
Chamber music	1993	Fanfares to Music	for brass ensembles (on- and off-stage)	
Chamber music	1993	Phantasmagoria (on Themes from The Ghosts of Versailles)	for cello and piano	
Chamber music	1993–1994	Two Works for Antiphonal Brass	for brass ensemble	
Chamber music	1994	Antiphon	for brass ensemble	2 versions: for 8 or 10 instruments
Chamber music	1994	How Like Pellucid States, Daddy. Or Like a...an Engine	for 4 bassoons	
Chamber music	1995	String Quartet	for 2 violins, viola and cello	winner of the 1997 Grammy Award for Best Classical Contemporary Composition
Chamber music	1996	Fancy on a Bach Air	for cello or viola	
Chamber music	1997	The Red Violin: Chaconne	for violin and piano	also for violin and orchestra
Chamber music	1999	The Red Violin Caprices	for violin	
Chamber music	2000	Utah Fanfare	for brass ensemble and percussion	
Chamber music	2003	Snapshot: Circa 1909	for 2 violins, viola and cello	
Chamber music	2010	Lullaby for Natalie	for violin and piano	
Chamber music	2010	Stomp	for violin	employs scordatura tuning
Chamber music	2016	Lucy's Aria from The Lord of Cries	for string quartet	
Keyboard	1959	Kaleidoscope	for 2 pianos	
Keyboard	1972	Gazebo Dances: 1. Overture; 2. Waltz; 3. Adagio; 4. Tarantella	for piano 4-hands	also versions for orchestra and band: 3. arranged for solo piano by Dolores Fredrickson (1992)
Keyboard	1976	Étude Fantasy	for piano	
Keyboard	1978	Étude No. 1	for piano left-hand	revised 2007
Keyboard	1985	Fantasia on an Ostinato	for piano	also orchestrated
Keyboard	1991	O God of Love from The Ghosts of Versailles	for organ	arranged by Richard Wayne Dirksen (2000)
Keyboard	1997	The Red Violin: Anna's Theme	for piano	
Keyboard	1997	Chiaroscuro	for 2 pianos tuned a quarter tone apart	
Keyboard	2007	A Birthday Cakewalk	for piano 4-hands	
Keyboard	2008	Winging It	for piano	
Vocal	1959	Petit Fours, Song Cyclette: 1. Upon Julia's Clothes; 2. The Turtle; 3. Une allée du Luxembourg; 4. The Ancient Mariner (verse 1)	for voice and piano	1. words by Robert Herrick; 2. words by Ogden Nash; 3. words by Aloysius Bertrand; 4. words by Samuel Taylor Coleridge
Vocal	1965	The Cloisters, 4 Songs: 1. Fort Tryon Park: September; 2. Song to the Witch of the Cloisters; 3. Christmas at the Cloisters; 4. The Unicorn	for voice and piano or chamber orchestra	words by William M. Hoffman: 3. also for mixed chorus and piano
Vocal	1970; 1999, 2003	Poem in October	for tenor and chamber ensemble for tenor and chamber orchestra	words by Dylan Thomas version with chamber orchestra 1999, revised 2003
Vocal	1971	Wedding Song	for medium voice and melody instruments, keyboards or guitar	words by William M. Hoffman
Vocal	1972	Creations, Two Scenes from Genesis: 1. The Creation of the World; 2. The Creation of Adam and Eve	for narrator and orchestra	
Vocal	1988	3 Irish Folksong Settings: 1. The Salley Gardens; 2. The Foggy Dew; 3. She Moved through the Fair	for voice and flute	words by W. B. Yeats, Padraic Colum and anonymous
Vocal	1991, 1992	The Ghosts of Versailles: Arias and Excerpts: Aria of the Worm; Figaro was Supposed to Return the Necklace: Beaumarchais' Aria; Samira's Aria: Cavatina and Cabaletta; They Are Always With Me: Marie Antoinette's Aria; They Wish They Could Kill Me: Figaro's Aria; As Summer Brings a Wistful Breeze; Come Now My Darling; O God of Love: Sextet	for voice(s) and piano: for tenor and piano; for baritone and piano; for mezzo-soprano and piano; for soprano and piano; for baritone and piano; for soprano, mezzo-soprano and piano; for 2 sopranos, mezzo-soprano, baritone and piano; for 3 sopranos, mezzo-soprano, 2 tenors and piano	words by William M. Hoffman
Vocal	1994	Jack and Jill	for voice and piano	words by William M. Hoffman
Vocal	1996	Liebeslied	for vocal quartet (soprano, alto, tenor, bass) and piano 4-hands	words by the composer
Vocal	1997–2008; 1997; 2001; 2008	Metamusic, 3 Songs for Theatre (also known as 3 Cabaret Songs): 1. Dodecaphonia; 2. Marvelous Invention (Songbook for a New Century); 3. End of the Line	for mezzo-soprano and piano	words by Mark Adamo
Vocal	1999	Vocalise	for soprano, electronics and orchestra	
Vocal	2000	Mr. Tambourine Man: Seven Poems of Bob Dylan: 1. Prelude: Mr. Tambourine Man; 2. Clothes Line; 3. Blowin' in the Wind; 4. Masters of War; 5. All Along The Watchtower; 6. Chimes of Freedom; 7. Postlude: Forever Young	for soprano and piano for soprano (amplified) and orchestra	orchestrated 2003 winner of the 2009 Grammy Award for Best Classical Contemporary Composition: 7. also for soprano and chorus a cappella
Vocal	2001	Irreverent Heart	for tenor and piano	words by Yip Harburg
Vocal	2003	Shatter Me, Music	for soprano	words by Rainer Maria Rilke adapted by Mark Adamo
Vocal	2005	One Sweet Morning	for voice and piano	words by Yip Harburg; also for female chorus
Vocal	2010	One Sweet Morning	for mezzo-soprano and orchestra	words by Czesław Miłosz, Homer, Li Bai and Yip Harburg
Choral	1959, 2011	Upon Julia's Clothes from Petit Fours	for female or mixed chorus and piano	words by Robert Herrick; arranged 2011
Choral	1960	Fern Hill	for mezzo-soprano, chorus and orchestra (or chamber ensemble)	words by Dylan Thomas revised 1965 with full orchestra revised 1999 with chamber orchestra
Choral	1962	What I Expected Was...	for mixed chorus, brass ensemble and percussion	words by Stephen Spender
Choral	1965	Christmas at the Cloisters	for mixed chorus and piano	words by William M. Hoffman original version from The Cloisters for voice and piano
Choral	1971	L'Invitation au Voyage	for soloists and mixed chorus a cappella	words by Charles Baudelaire in translation by Richard Wilbur
Choral	1972	A Black November Turkey	for mixed chorus a cappella	words by Richard Wilbur; also for string quartet
Choral	1976, 1999	A Dylan Thomas Trilogy: 1. Author's Prologue, Part I 2. Fern Hill; 3. Author's Prologue, Part II; 4. Poem in October; 5. Poem on His Birthday	for baritone, tenor, boy soprano (or countertenor), mixed chorus and orchestra	words by Dylan Thomas; revised 1999: 5. also for baritone and mixed chorus a cappella
Choral	1976	Psalm No. 8	for mixed chorus and organ	
Choral	1991	Of Rage and Remembrance, Chaconne	for mezzo-soprano, boy soprano, male chorus, cellos, double basses and chimes	words by William M. Hoffman based on the 3rd movement of Symphony No. 1
Choral	1994	Amen	for antiphonal double chorus a cappella	
Choral	2000	Forever Young from Mr. Tambourine Man: Seven Poems of Bob Dylan	for soprano and chorus a cappella	words by Bob Dylan
Choral	2005	One Sweet Morning	for female chorus a cappella	words by Yip Harburg; also for voice and piano
Choral	2005	Salute	for mixed chorus with kazoos, brass and percussion	
Choral	2011	Upon Julia's Clothes	for female chorus or mixed chorus and piano	words by Robert Herrick
Choral	2014	Meditation	for male chorus and violin	
Vocal	2025	Tennessee Songs	for violin, piano, and female voice	words by Tennessee Williams
