= Susskind =

Susskind (German Süßkind "sweet child", variants Suskind, Suskin, Siskind, Ziskind, Ziskin, Siskin, etc.) is a mostly Jewish surname of German origin.

== History ==
Süsskind in the German medieval period was a given name, not a surname, specifically recorded as carried by Jews since the early 13th century. A Jew named Süsskind is recorded as a physician in the hospital of Würzburg in 1218.

Süsskind, the Jew of Trimberg (Middle High German Sueskint der Jude von Trimperg) is one of the minnesingers whose work is compiled in the early-14th-century Codex Manesse. This poet is otherwise unknown, and there is no proof that the poems recorded under his name are from a single author, but the language of the poems is consistent with an author of the second half of the 13th century native to the Rhineland. There is also a Jewish motif in V.2, where the poet proclaims his intention to leave the courtly sphere and live humbly "in the manner of old Jews", besides possible allusions to Hebrew prayers in I.3.

Süsskind remained a widely used given name among German-speaking Jews into the 19th century. Beginning in the 18th century, some Jews adopted Süsskind as a patronymic surname. Süsskind ceased to be used as a given name around mid-19th-century.

The baronial family of Süßkind is descended from Johann Gottlieb Süßkind, a cousin of theologian Friedrich Gottlieb Süskind, who was given the title of nobility by the king of Bavaria in 1821. The family is descended from one Michael Süßkind, recorded as a citizen of Esslingen in 1425.

The surname was introduced to the United States by the 1880s.

Karl Fedor Süsskind, born in Dresden in 1843, introduced the surname "Süssekind" in Brazil. He initially settled in Salvador in 1861 before relocating to Rio de Janeiro in 1879.

== People with the given name ==
- Süsskind of Trimberg, 13th-century minnesinger
- Alexander Süsskind of Grodno (d. 1794), Russian kabbalist
- Süsskind Raschkow (d. 1836), German poet
- Jekutiel-Süßkind Cohen, rabbi, father of Raphael Cohen (Rafael ben Jekutiel Süsskind Kohen, 1722–1803), Chief Rabbi of Altona-Hamburg-Wandsbek

== People with the surname ==
=== Susskind ===
- Andrew Susskind, American film and TV producer, and TV director
- Arthur Susskind (1886–1967), American boxer
- David Susskind (1920–1987), American producer and talk show host
- Fred Susskind (1891–1957), South African Test cricketer
- Jamie Susskind (born 1989), English barrister and author
- Leonard Susskind (b. 1940), American theoretical physicist and father of string theory
- Lawrence Susskind (b. 1947), American dispute mediator
- Richard Susskind (b. 1961), British legal and IT adviser
- Steve Susskind (1942–2005), American actor and singer
- Walter Susskind (1913–1980), Czech conductor

=== Suskind ===
- Dana L. Suskind (born 1968), American professor
- Richard Suskind (1925–1999), American writer convicted of fraud
- Ron Suskind (b. 1959), American author and investigative journalist

=== Süskind ===
- Friedrich Gottlieb Süskind (1767–1829), German Protestant theologian
- Patrick Süskind (b. 1949), German writer and screenwriter, son of Wilhelm Emanuel Süskind
- Walter Süskind (1906–1945), German Holocaust victim
- Wilhelm Emanuel Süskind (1901–1970), German author and journalist, father of Patrick Süskind

=== Süssekind ===
- Arnaldo Süssekind (1917–2012) Brazilian jurist, Minister of Labor, and representative of Brazil in the International Labour Organization.
- Augusto Süssekind de Moraes Rego (1908–1989) Brazilian lawyer famous for defending political prisoners during the military dictatorship.
- Carlos Sussekind (1933–2021) Brazilian writer.
- José Carlos Sussekind (born 1947) Brazilian engineer renowned for designing the world-famous works of Oscar Niemeyer.
- Flora Süssekind (born 1955) Brazilian literary critic and literature professor.

== See also ==
- Soskin, surname
- Süskind (film), 2012 Dutch film about Walter Süskind (1906–1945)
- Topics named after Leonard Susskind
  - Smolin–Susskind debate
  - Kogut–Susskind fermion
  - Susskind–Glogower operator
  - Fischler–Susskind mechanism
  - Susskind–Hawking battle
- Sussman
- Süß
- Jud Süß (1940 film)
