= The Mannheim Rocket =

The Mannheim Rocket is a short orchestra composition by the American composer John Corigliano. The work was commissioned by the Mannheim Orchestra, which first performed the work on March 26, 2001. The piece is dedicated to Susan Carlyle.

== Composition ==
The Mannheim Rocket is composed in a single movement and has a duration of roughly 11 minutes. The piece was inspired by the so-called "Mannheim crescendo" or "Mannheim rocket"—a musical technique perfected by the Mannheim Orchestra in the 18th century in which "a rising figure (a scale or arpeggio) sped up and grew louder as it rose higher and higher." Corigliano first heard the term in a music history class during his Freshman year at college. Despite its actual meaning, the composer recalled in the score program note, "As a young music student, however my imagination construed a very different image — that of a giant 18th-century wedding-cake-rocket, commandeered by the great Baron Von Münchausen, and its marvelous journey to the heavens and back. It was this image that excited me when I was asked to write a work for the Mannheim Orchestra: I knew I had to recreate the rocket of my young imagination and travel with it through its adventures."

The music thus opens with a quote from the Symphony in E-flat by Johann Stamitz, who was one of the originators of the "Mannheim rocket." Afterward, the music freely quotes German music from the succeeding centuries.

=== Instrumentation ===
The work is scored for a large orchestra comprising three flutes (doubling piccolo), three oboes, three clarinets (doubling bass clarinet), three bassoons (doubling contrabassoon), four horns, three trumpets, three trombones, tuba, timpani, four percussionists, harp, piano, and strings.

== Reception ==
The Mannheim Rocket has been praised by music critics. Edward Seckerson of Gramophone wrote, "This 10-minute crowd-pleaser takes the 18th-century concept of a rising scale or arpeggio propelled faster, louder and higher into space, and turns it into something which might easily have emanated from the imagination of Baron Munchausen and found favour with Gerard Hoffnung." He added, "This rocket-propelled wedding-cake climbs through 200 years of German music: Stamitz, Brahms, Strauss's Till Eulenspiegel, Wagner's Valkyries… and, more contentiously, the Mastersingers." Andrew Clements of The Guardian compared the work favorably to Corigliano's Symphony No. 2, writing, "The scoring is virtuosic and at least the music does not pretend to have any more profound aspirations."

== See also ==
- List of compositions by John Corigliano
