= Pied Piper Fantasy =

The Pied Piper Fantasy is a concerto for flute and orchestra by the American composer John Corigliano. The work was commissioned by the flutist James Galway and it is based on the tale of the Pied Piper of Hamelin. The piece was given its world premiere by Galway and the Los Angeles Philharmonic under the conductor Myung-whun Chung at the Dorothy Chandler Pavilion on February 4, 1982. In 1993, the critic Mark Swed of the Los Angeles Times described it as "one of the best known of modern American concertos."

== Composition ==
=== Background ===
The flutist James Galway first approached John Corigliano about writing a flute concerto for him in 1978. The composer was initially apprehensive about writing another concerto for a woodwind instrument, having recently completed his Oboe Concerto in 1975 and his Clarinet Concerto in 1977. Corigliano postponed committing himself to the project, but kept it in mind. In the meantime, Corigliano studied Galway's performance techniques and began studying legends surrounding flutes and tin whistles. This led him to the story of the Pied Piper of Hamelin and to the idea of casting Galway as the Piper in his own flute concerto. The composer recalled in the program notes, "Galway as the Piper seemed the most natural thing in the world, for to many, myself included, he is a kind of Pied Piper... Here, the mating of personality and instrument could hardly be better." He added, "But what was even more exciting was that this could offer me a new way of writing a wind concerto. The idea of a programmatic fantasy-concerto based on the Pied Piper legend became a fascinating structural challenge. I contacted Galway with the proposal of writing a Pied Piper Fantasy and, with his approval, started planning the work."

Corigliano partially based the form of the work on Robert Browning's narrative poem "The Pied Piper of Hamelin," arguably the most famous version of the tale. However, the composer altered the narrative to better fit a musical setting, explaining, "The biggest problem was that the legend per se had no elements of virtuosity in it; the Pied Piper played his song to charm the rats and lead them to destruction and piped a march to lead the children away from Hamelin, but there were no actual confrontations or tensions that could lead me to write virtuosically for the soloist. So I had to modify the story a bit, and I included battle scenes between the Piper and the rats and other elements that could set the soloist’s fingers racing." He added, "In restructuring the legend I had to provide a logical continuity for this story, but I also had to produce a satisfying purely musical structure so that the piece worked as a concerto for flute and orchestra too."

=== Structure ===
The Pied Piper Fantasy has a duration of roughly 38 minutes and is composed in seven movements played without pause:

1. Sunrise and the Piper's Song
2. The Rats
3. Battle with the Rats
4. War Cadenza
5. The Piper's Victory
6. The Burgher's Chorale
7. The Children's March

The first movement "Sunrise and the Piper's Song" illustrates the sunrise with "pointillistic night sounds" culminating in an orchestral tutti; it also introduces the "Piper's Song," which reappears throughout the work. The second movement "The Rats" uses the orchestra to simulate the squeaking and scurrying sounds of the rodents. In "Battle with the Rats," the soloist enters as the Piper and competes for dominance over the "rats" represented by the orchestra. In "War Cadenza," the battle continues, featuring an extended cadenza from the soloist. In "The Piper's Victory," the "Piper's Song" reemerges as the Piper hypnotizes and finally defeats the rats. With "The Burgher’s Chorale," the townspeople of Hamelin are represented by a "pompous" chorale accompanied by a bass drum; the orchestra proceeds in a coarse dialogue with the soloist, until the Piper can take no more. In the final movement "The Children's March," the soloist switches from flute to tin whistle as he begins lure the town's children away; for this movement, a group of child performers hidden amongst the audience begin to play and eventually follow the Piper onto the stage and out of the performance hall, leaving the sorrowful orchestra behind.

=== Instrumentation ===
The work is scored for a solo flute (doubling tin whistle or piccolo) and a large orchestra consisting of three flutes (2nd doubling piccolo; 3rd flute optional), three oboes, three clarinets (3rd doubling E-flat clarinet and bass clarinet), three bassoons (3rd doubling contrabassoon), four horns, three trumpets, three trombones, tuba, timpani, four percussionists, harp, piano (doubling celesta), and strings. The score also calls for a group of child performers consisting of 9 to 18 flutists and two drums interspersed among the audience; this group plays only during the final movement, "The Children's March," when they gather on stage before following the soloist out of the performance hall.

== Reception ==
The Pied Piper Fantasy has been praised by some music critics. Jack Hurst of the Chicago Tribune observed, "Corigliano gives exuberant rein to his eclecticism in this seven-movement programmatic retelling of the Pied Piper of Hamelin legend, combining Brittenish lyricism, new-fangled splashes of dissonance, old-fashioned virtuoso gestures (for both flute and tin whistle) and amusing onomatopoeic effects (the scurrying, squeaking music for the rats) with his usual craftsmanlike skill." Edward Reichel of Deseret News said the concerto "shows Corigliano at his most colorful and descriptive in terms of orchestration and melodic inventiveness."

Not all criticism was positive, however. Despite saying it was "expertly tailored as a vehicle for the virtuosity and the highly individual timbre of James Galway," Michael Oliver of Gramophone was critical of all but the final movement, writing, "...of strong ideas strong enough to sustain a structure nearly 40 minutes in length, there is not a sign. Even that modestly effective finale plays for nine-and-a-half minutes, approximately seven minutes longer than its several-times-repeated material will bear and none of the other movements has half its character." Reviewing a recording of the piece with other flute concertos, Joshua Kosman of the San Francisco Chronicle compared the work unfavorably to Chen Yi's The Golden Flute, remarking, "[Corigliano's] writing is full of illustrative goodies -- you can hear the rats march in and out, hear the townsfolk react and even hear the children being spirited away by the piper's golden tones." He continued, "But it's not clear that Corigliano's theatrical bonbon, a concert entertainment written for James Galway and based on Browning's poem, is the most interesting music on offer here."

== See also ==
- List of compositions by John Corigliano
