= Siskind =

Siskind is a German-Jewish surname meaning "sweet child", thought to have originated during the early nineteenth century period when German officials assigned surnames to Jews. People having this surname include:

- Aaron Siskind (1903–1991), a renowned American photographer
- Amy Siskind (born 1965), an American activist and writer
- Arthur Siskind (born 1938), a lawyer, businessperson, and executive director of the News Corporation
- Edward Siskind (1886–1955), an American football and basketball coach
- Jeffrey Mark Siskind, writer of the optimizing batch whole-program Scheme compiler used in the program, Stalin
- Jeremy Siskind (born 1986), a jazz pianist taught by Sophia Rosoff
- Mariano Siskind (born 1972), Argentine writer, scholar and poet, Professor at Harvard University
- Martin Siskind, former manager of artist Purvis Young, who successfully petitioned for Young to be declared mentally incompetent
- Murray Jay Siskind, a fictional character in the novel, White Noise
- Paul Siskind, composer of the opera The Sailor-Boy and the Falcon, with librettist Alan Steinberg
- Sarah Siskind (born 1978), an American folk singer and songwriter
- Scott Siskind (born 1984), American blogger and psychiatrist better known under the pseudonym Scott Alexander

== See also ==
- Susskind
