= Valerie Vonpechy =

American composer, harpist, and educator

Valerie Vonpechy Whitcup (born 11 December 1947) is an American composer, harpist, and educator.

Vonpechy was born in Cleveland, Ohio. She graduated from Baldwin-Wallace College and the University of Miami, and studied harp with Edward Vito, the principal harpist with Arturo Toscanini's NBC Orchestra. She married Peter Whitcup. Most of her work is published under the name "Vonpechy."

Vonpechy was a visiting professor at the University of Illinois before moving to Florida. She was the principal harpist of the Florida Philharmonic Orchestra for 35 years, played for the Florida Grand Opera, and toured with the Moscow Chamber Orchestra. She was the harp instructor at the University of Miami for 30 years.

Vonpechy arranged John Corigliano's choral composition L'Invitation au Voyage for flute and harp in 1988. In 2001, Vonpechy and double bassist Lucas Drew founded St. Francis Music Publications to publish repertoire for double bass, cello, harp, and string ensembles. They have released seven volumes of original harp solos, transcriptions, and arrangements by Vonpechy's late teacher Edward Vito, which Vonpechy edited and prepared for publication. The series is entitled From the Library of Edward Vito.

A versatile musician, Vonpechy has toured or appeared live with Frank Sinatra, the Bee Gees, Tom Jones, the Moody Blues, Ray Charles, Aretha Franklin, Barry White, KC and the Sunshine Band, Rick James, Tony Bennett, Lauryn Hill, and the Reggae Band. Recordings in which Vonpechy participated include:

- Acugenics- Stress Relief In Five Minutes (Gateway Records GSLP 7613)
- Billion Dollar Band (Good Sounds GS102)
- Do You Wanna Go Party
- Passion (Prelude Records – PRL 12176)
- Voyage (Albany Records TR1185)

Vonpechy's music is published by Elkin Music International, G. Schirmer Inc., and St. Francis Music Publications. Her compositions include:

== Works ==
=== Chamber ===
- Dream and Csardas (string quartet, flute, clarinet and harp)
- Duet (flute and harp)
- Flight of Fancy (oboe, bassoon, and harp)
- Sunrise at Rocky Knob (oboe and harp)
- Sweet Is My Ladye Love (unaccompanied harp)
- Two Pieces for Diatonic Harp

=== Musical Theater ===
- Armadillo’s Pillow
- Webster the Musical Spider

=== Vocal ===
- "Cloudy" (text by Mary Ann Vonpechy; music by Valerie Vonpechy)
- Five Lullabies (flute, harp, and soprano)
