= Bunke (surname) =

Bunke is a surname. Notable people with the surname include:

- Franz Bunke (1857–1939), German painter
- Jerome Bunke (born 1945), American clarinetist
- Lennart Bunke (1912–1988), Swedish footballer
- Monika Bunke, German canoeist
- Tamara Bunke (1937–1967), Argentine-born East German revolutionary
