= Daniel Susskind =

British economist and academic

- Scientific career
- Fields: Economics; Information technology; Artificial intelligence
- Workplaces: King's College London; University of Oxford
- Website: www.danielsusskind.com

Daniel Susskind is a British economist and academic, studying the impact of technology and society, with a focus on artificial intelligence and its associated risks.

He is the research professor in economics at King's College London. He also serves as a Senior Research Associate at the Institute for Ethics in AI and as an associate member of the Economics Department at Oxford University.

He has been the president of the Society for Computers and Law (SCL) since 2011.

== Works ==
Susskind is the author of A World Without Work (2020) and Growth: A Reckoning (2024), which was noted by United States President Barack Obama as one of his "Favorite Books of 2024." He is the co-author of The Future of the Professions: How Technology Will Transform the Work of Human Experts (2015) with legal scholar Richard Susskind, his father.

He has stated that "In the 21st century, the best ideas will come from AI" and that it will "combine insights from multiple disciplines to deliver holistic, adaptive education at scale." He has also expressed that people should be "preparing for AGI, or at least 'near-AGI', to arrive between 2030 and 2035."

== Family ==
Susskind is the grandson of Werner and Shirley Susskind.

In 1985, his father Richard Eric Susskind married Michelle Latter. He has two siblings: Jamie and Alexandra. His father Richard Eric Susskind is his co-author of The Future of the Professions. Jamie Susskind is a barrister and the author of Future Politics and The Digital Republic, which also examine the future of technology.
