= Stanley Drucker =

American musician (1929–2022)

- Born: February 4, 1929; Brooklyn, New York, U.S.
- Died: December 19, 2022 (aged 93) Vista, California, U.S.
- Instrument: Clarinet
- Years active: 1948–2009
- Formerly of: Indianapolis Symphony Orchestra; Buffalo Philharmonic Orchestra; New York Philharmonic

Stanley Drucker (February 4, 1929 – December 19, 2022) was an American clarinetist. For nearly five decades, he was principal clarinetist of the New York Philharmonic. According to Guinness World Records, he achieved the longest career as a clarinetist. Drucker premiered the clarinet concerto by John Corigliano.

== Life ==
Born in Brooklyn, New York, on February 4, 1929, of Russian-Jewish ancestry, Drucker began clarinet studies at age ten with Leon Russianoff, and remained his student for five years. He attended the High School of Music & Art (now the Fiorello H. LaGuardia High School of Music & Art and Performing Arts, at Lincoln Square). Although Drucker entered the Curtis Institute of Music at the age of 15, he left after one year when he was recruited by the Indianapolis Symphony Orchestra. After a year, he worked with the Busch Little Symphony, organized by Adolf Busch. He then became principal clarinetist of the Buffalo Philharmonic Orchestra, beginning in the autumn of 1947.

In 1948, Drucker won a post in the New York Philharmonic clarinet section playing third and E-flat clarinet. In 1960, he became the orchestra's principal clarinetist, where he remained for the duration of his career. His time with the New York Philharmonic included nearly 150 solo appearances with the orchestra. He gave the first performances of clarinet concertos by John Corigliano and William Bolcom, both of these commissions for the New York Philharmonic. Drucker appeared on two recordings of the Corigliano Clarinet Concerto, a studio recording conducted by Zubin Mehta and a live recording of the 1977 premiere performance conducted by Leonard Bernstein.

In 1981, he performed with the Naumburg Orchestral Concerts, in the Naumburg Bandshell, Central Park, in the summer series.

In January 2008, the New York Philharmonic announced Drucker's retirement from the orchestra at the close of the 2008–2009 season, for a total of 61 years with the orchestra and 49 years as its principal clarinet. His final solo appearance with the orchestra was held in June 2009, in performances of the clarinet concerto of Aaron Copland.

== Legacy ==
Drucker was highly regarded for his musicianship and his longevity of service with the New York Philharmonic, totaling 10,200 concerts, such as expressed by Gustavo Dudamel in November 2007: "He's a legend. The history of the orchestra is in him." In 2009, Lorin Maazel said: "He stands alone in the world of clarinetists. His contribution to the orchestra and its fame is immeasurable."

== Awards ==
Drucker was nominated for two Grammy Awards (1981, 1991).

On June 4, 2009, Drucker was awarded a Guinness World Record for longest career as a clarinetist after his performance of Aaron Copland's Clarinet Concerto with the orchestra. Guinness thus logged his philharmonic career at "62 years, 7 months and 1 day as of June 4, 2009".

He was named honorary member of the New York Philharmonic, as the first orchestra musician honored.

In 2010, Drucker received an honorary doctorate in music from the University of Florida.

Drucker appears in The New Grove Dictionary of Music and Musicians.

== Personal life ==
Drucker was married to Naomi Drucker, a former principal clarinetist of the North Carolina Symphony, music professor at Hofstra University, and co-founder and co-director of the American Chamber Ensemble. They have two children, Leon, who is the double bassist for The Stray Cats under the stage name of "Lee Rocker", and Rosanne, an alternative-country singer–songwriter.

Drucker died in Vista, California, on December 19, 2022, at age 93.

== Discography ==
- Stanley Drucker Heritage Collection: Live In Concert (1–5) (2017) – Louis Spohr, Max Bruch, Max Lifchitz, Johannes Brahms, Daniel Gregory Mason, Francis Poulenc, Bernhard Crusell, Igor Stravinsky, Béla Bartók, Wolfgang Amadeus Mozart, Paul Hindemith, Alfred Prinz, Carl Maria von Weber, Leonard Bernstein, Gordon Jacob, Jacob Weinberg – Produced by Jerome Bunke
- Stanley Drucker Heritage Collection: From The Vaults (6–7) (2019) – Carl Nielsen, Milton Babbitt, Valley Weigl, Mario Davidovsky, Arthur Honegger, Béla Bartók, Claude Debussy, Louis Spohr, Gordon Jacob, Arthur Bliss, John Corigliano
- Stanley Drucker Heritage Collection: Hidden Gems (8–9) (2022) – Michael Whalen, Charles Schwartz, Johannes Brahms, John Corigliano, Meyer Kupferman, Claude Debussy, Alban Berg, Nicolas Roussakis, Scott McAllister
- Stanley Drucker Heritage Collection: Coda (10–14) (2024) – Franz Krommer, Alexander Krein, Leonard Bernstein, Giacomo Meyerbeer, Lászlo Weiner, Ludwig van Beethoven, Wolfgang Amadeus Mozart, Charles Ives, Edward Thomas, Elie Sigmeister, Paul Hindemith, Sergei Prokofiev, Samuel Barber, Felix Mendelssohn, Georg Phillipp Telemann, Louis Spohr, Johannes Brahms, Meyer Kupferman, Francis Poulenc, Claude Debussy, Luciano Berio

== Recordings ==
- Corigliano, John; Drucker, Stanley; Mehta, Zubin; Barber, Samuel; Recorded Anthology of American Music, Inc; New York Philharmonic; DRAM (Online service) (2007), Concerto for clarinet and orchestra (in no linguistic content), New York, N.Y.: DRAM, OCLC 162129947
- Copland, Aaron; Drucker, Stanley; Bernstein, Leonard; New Yorks Filharmoniske Orkester (1991), El salón México (in undetermined language), Hamburg: DGG, OCLC 874532992
- Mozart, Wolfgang Amadeus; Margalit, Israela; Drucker, Stanley; Robinson, Joseph; LeClair, Judith; Myers, Philip; Essex Quartet (2003), Clarinet quintet; Piano and wind quintet (in no linguistic content), London: Universal Classics, OCLC 993605030
- Thomas, Edward; Gosling, Stephen; Drucker, Stanley; Yedidia, Ronn, Concerto for clarinet and orchestra (in no linguistic content), [Place of publication not identified]: Forte Recording Ltd, OCLC 906588192
- Nielsen, Carl; Baker, Julius; Drucker, Stanley; Stern, Isaac; Bernstein, Leonard; Hindemith, Paul; New York Philharmonic (1993), Concerto for flute and orchestra; Concerto for clarinet and orchestra, op. 57 (in no linguistic content), [Place of publication not identified]: Sony Classical, OCLC 37286414
- Debussy, Claude; Ravel, Maurice; Bernstein, Leonard; Drucker, Stanley; Singer, Joseph; New York Philharmonic (1960), Images pour orchestre Rhapsody No. 1 for clarinet and orchestra (in no linguistic content), [London], [New York]: Sony Music Entertainment; Sony Classical, OCLC 781147209
- Bartók, Béla; Drucker, Stanley; Mann, Robert; Hambro, Leonid, Contrasts for violin, clarinet and piano Sonata for solo violin (in undetermined language), [New York (N.Y.)]: Bartók Records, OCLC 610629659

== General and cited references ==
- Estrin, Mitchell; Corigliano, John (2018). Stanley Drucker : clarinet master. New York: Carl Fischer. ISBN 978-1-4911-5117-4. OCLC 1052780901.
- Weston, Pamela (1989). Clarinet virtuosi of today. Baldock, UK: Egon. ISBN 0-905858-46-8. OCLC 24754686.
