= Campane di Ravello =

Orchestral composition by American composer John Corigliano

Campane di Ravello (A Celebration Piece for Sir Georg Solti) is a short orchestral composition by the American composer John Corigliano. The work was commissioned by the Chicago Symphony Orchestra for the 75th birthday of its then music director Georg Solti. Its world premiere was given by the Chicago Symphony Orchestra under the direction of Kenneth Jean on October 9, 1987.

== Composition ==
Campane di Ravello is cast in a single movement and has a duration of roughly three minutes.

=== Background ===
Campane di Ravello was Corigliano's first commission as the Chicago Symphony Orchestra's newly appointed composer-in-residence. His inspiration for the piece came while he vacationed in Ravello, Italy, as the composer recalled in the score program notes:

On Sundays, the multitude of churches in Ravello and the surrounding towns play their bells, each in a different key and rhythm. The cacophony is gorgeous, and uniquely festive. My tribute to Sir Georg attempts to make the sections of the symphony orchestra sound like pealing bells: that tolling, filigreed with birdcalls in the woodwinds, provides the backdrop for a theme that grows more and more familiar as it is clarified. At the end, it is clear and joyous – a tribute to a great man.

The music contains subtle melodic references to the song "Happy Birthday to You."

=== Instrumentation ===
The work is scored for a large orchestra consisting of piccolo, three flutes, three oboes, cor anglais, three clarinets, bass clarinet, three bassoons, contrabassoon, four horns, four trumpets, three trombones, tuba, timpani, six percussionists, harp, piano, and strings.

== Reception ==
Reviewing a television broadcast of the world premiere, described the piece as "a mini-tone poem, a sly arrangement of 'Happy Birthday.'" Lawrence A. Johnson of the Chicago Classical Review also praised the piece, writing, "Corigliano's brief curtain-raiser cleverly melds gently discordant tolling wind and brass chords into an off-center fanfare in which strains of 'Happy Birthday' gradually emerge from the hurly-burly."

However, the music was criticized by Antony Bye of BBC Music Magazine, who remarked, "compare Stravinsky's Birthday Greeting with Corigliano's Campane di Ravello – 'A Celebration Piece for Sir Georg Solti' to discover the difference between real genius and mere talent." John von Rhein of the Chicago Tribune similarly remarked, "Corigliano went on to write bigger and more substantial scores than this four-minute piece d'occasion once he became the orchestra's first composer in residence shortly after the premiere of his little happy-birthday ode. That familiar tune gradually emerged from a haze of bell-like dissonances before being taken up by the full orchestra."

== See also ==
- List of compositions by John Corigliano
