= Elegy (Corigliano) =

Orchestral composition

Elegy is an orchestral composition by the American composer John Corigliano. It was first performed by the San Francisco Symphony under the direction Verne Sellin at the War Memorial Opera House on June 1, 1966. The piece is dedicated to the composer Samuel Barber.

== Composition ==
Elegy is composed in a single movement and has a duration of roughly 7 minutes. The work is based on an incidental score Corigliano wrote for an Off-Broadway production of Wallace Frey's play Helen; the music is specifically derived from a love scene between the titular character Helen of Troy and her young lover Telemachus. The composer wrote in the score program notes, "The brief work, set at a single slow tempo, begins quickly with a key passage for paired flutes, builds during its course to two double forte climaxes for full orchestra, and finally subsides for a pianissimo close for strings and woodwinds. Stylistically, as the dedication to Samuel Barber might suggest, the work identifies itself with neo-romantic American style, typified in a diversity of works by Barber himself, Walter Piston, or William Schuman."

=== Instrumentation ===
The work is scored for an orchestra consisting of two flutes (1st doubling piccolo), two oboes, two clarinets, two bassoons, two horns, trumpet, bass trombone, timpani, percussion, piano, and strings.

== Reception ==
Steve Metcalf of the Hartford Courant described the piece as "haunting." Peter Dickinson of Gramophone wrote, "Elegy provides early evidence that the mantle of Samuel Barber, to whom it is dedicated, would fall on Corigliano." He added, "Both composers contradicted fashions by querying any necessity for their music to be difficult."

== See also ==
- List of compositions by John Corigliano
