= Oboe Concerto (Corigliano) =

20th-century oboe concerto by John Corigliano

The Concerto for Oboe and Orchestra is a composition for solo oboe and orchestra by the American composer John Corigliano. The work was commissioned by the New York State Council on the Arts and was first performed in Carnegie Hall on November 9, 1975, by the oboist Bert Lucarelli and the American Symphony Orchestra under the conductor Kazuyoshi Akiyama.

== Composition ==
=== Background ===
Corigliano described the composition of the Oboe Concerto in the score program notes, writing:

In the Oboe Concerto it was the instrument itself that gave me the variety of materials. The oboe is capable of doing things other than playing a beautiful melodic line, and I used some of its unique abilities as building blocks for my concerto. For example, along with the bassoon the oboe is unique in that its lower register is its most forceful. This special quality gave me the idea of constructing a movement where there would be a dynamic arch which was reversed – i.e., the oboe would begin high and soft, drop to the bottom of its range for the music's "peak," then ascend for a quiet end. The concerto is cast in five brief movements, the form itself arising from the different aspects of the oboe. Before I begin to write a piece I always want to know how each movement will relate to the other. Every movement of the Oboe Concerto – each based on a different quality of the instrument – was mapped out in advance: the way the first is based on the tuning ritual, the fact that the second avoids a climax, the use of multiphonics (non-definable chords, often using quarter-tones or tones between tones) in the third, the reverse-arch form in the fourth, the Arabic oboe in the finale.

=== Music ===
The concerto has a duration of roughly 26 minutes and is composed in five short movements:

1. Tuning Game
2. Song
3. Scherzo
4. Aria
5. Rheita Dance

The work is scored for a solo oboe and orchestra, comprising two flutes (doubling piccolo), oboe, two clarinets (doubling E-flat clarinet), two bassoons, two horns, trumpet, trombone, timpani, three percussionists, xylophone, harp, piano (doubling celesta), and strings.

== Reception ==
Edward Seckerson of Gramophone praised the concerto, writing:

As with the Clarinet Concerto, Corigliano seeks wilfully to disregard traditional role models. His oboe is pitted against unreasonable opposition partly to extend its range, to stretch its rarely heard dramatic potential. Forceful multiphonics are brought to bear in the scherzo, while the finale goes middle-eastern, with a pungent simulation (no lip or tongue contact with the reeds) of the Moroccan oboe, the rheita. All of which effectively counters and complements the oboe's singing qualities.

== See also ==
- List of compositions by John Corigliano
