= Sylvia Molloy (writer) =

Argentine professor, author, editor and essayist (1938–2022)

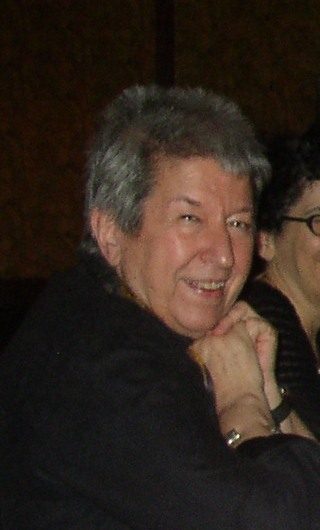
- Born: 29 August 1938; Buenos Aires, Argentina
- Died: 14 July 2022 (aged 83); Long Island, U.S.
- Occupations: Writer, academic
- Writing career
- Subjects: LGBT fiction, autobiography

Sylvia Molloy (29 August 1938 – 14 July 2022) was an Argentine professor, author, editor and essayist based in New York.

== Biography ==
Molloy was born to an Irish father and a French mother on 29 August 1938 in Buenos Aires and raised in Argentina, where she grew up speaking English, French and Spanish. She moved to Paris in 1958 and graduated with her PhD in Comparative Literature from the Sorbonne in 1967. Molloy then became a Fellow of the Guggenheim Foundation, the National Endowment for the Humanities, the Social Science Research Council, and the Civitella Ranieri Foundation. She was chair of the Modern Language Association of America in 2001 and the International Institute of Latin American Studies. Molloy was awarded title of Doctor Honoris Causa from Tulane University. She has taught at both Yale and Princeton universities. In 1974 she became the first woman to gain tenure at Princeton University. In 2007, she created the first Master of Fine Arts degree in the United States in creative Spanish writing at New York University where she held the Albert Schweitzer chair of Humanities.

Molloy died from cancer in Long Island on 14 July 2022, at the age of 83.

== Bibliography ==
=== Essays ===
- La Diffusion de la littérature hispano-américaine en France au XXe siècle (1972)
- Las letras de Borges (1979)
- At Face Value: Autobiographical Writing in Spanish America (1991)
- Acto de presencia: la literatura autobiográfica en Hispanoamérica (1997)
- Poses de fin de siglo. Desbordes del género en la modernidad (2013)
- Citas de lectura (2017)

=== Fiction ===
- En breve cárcel (1981)
- El común olvido (2002)
- Varia imaginación (2003)
- Desarticulaciones (2010)
- Vivir entre lenguas (2016)

=== With others ===
- Hispanisms and Homosexualities (1998, with Robert McKee Irwin)
- Poéticas de la distancia. Adentro y afuera de la literatura argentina (2006, with Mariano Siskind)

== Awards ==
- 1994 Konex Award for Literary Essay
- 2014 Konex Award for Literary Essay
