= Stephanie Blythe =

American mezzo-soprano

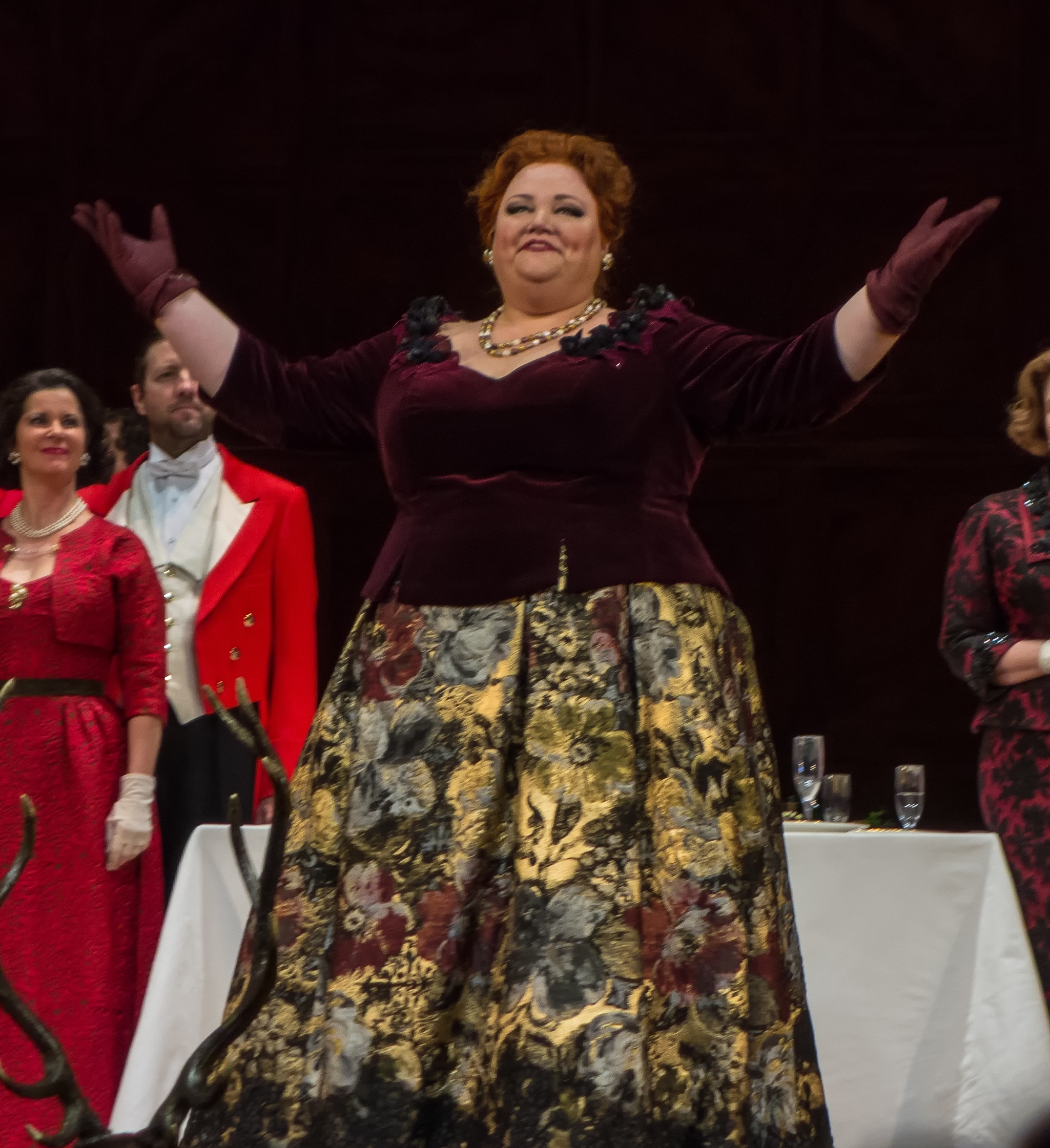
Blythe at the Metropolitan Opera House in 2013

Stephanie Blythe (born 1970) is an American mezzo-soprano who has had an active international career in operas and concerts since the early 1990s. She is particularly associated with the Metropolitan Opera in New York City, with whom she has performed annually since her debut with the company in 1995. In 2014 she starred as Gertrude Stein in the world premiere of 27, an opera composed by Ricky Ian Gordon with libretto by Royce Vavrek, and commissioned for her by the Opera Theatre of Saint Louis. She currently serves as Artistic Director of the Graduate Vocal Arts Program at Bard College Conservatory (part of Bard College) in Annandale-on-Hudson, New York.

== Early life ==
Blythe grew up in Mongaup Valley, New York and studied the flute as a child. She graduated from Monticello High School (New York) in 1987. While attending Monticello, she was first exposed to live opera when her high school music teacher took her class to the Metropolitan Opera for a matinee of La bohème. She went on to study vocal performance with Patricia Misslin at the Crane School of Music at the State University of New York at Potsdam (SUNY Potsdam), from which she graduated with a degree in English Writing in 1991 and a degree in Music in 1992.

In 1994 she won the Metropolitan Opera National Council Auditions, and then became a member of the Lindemann Young Artists Development Program at the Met.

== Career ==
Blythe made her professional opera debut at the Metropolitan Opera as the Voice from Above in Wagner's Parsifal on April 14, 1995. Her career was transformed the following season when she stood in for Marilyn Horne at the Metropolitan Opera as Mistress Quickly in Falstaff and received rave reviews. She has subsequently achieved critical success in a variety of roles at the Met, including Amneris in Aida (2012), Auntie in Peter Grimes (1997, 2003), Azucena in Il trovatore (2013), Baba the Turk in The Rake's Progress (1998), Berta in The Barber of Seville (1995), Cornelia in Handel's Giulio Cesare (1999), Eduige in Rodelinda (2004-2006, 2011), Fricka in Die Walküre (2008, 2011-2013) and Das Rheingold (2010-2013), Frugola in Il tabarro (2007), Gertrud in Hansel and Gretel (1997, 2001-2002), Jezibaba in Rusalka (2009), Jocasta in Oedipus Rex (2003-2004), Ludmila in The Bartered Bride (1996), Madelon in Andrea Chénier (1996), Mama Lucia in Cavalleria rusticana (1997), Mother Marie in Dialogues des Carmélites (2002-2003), Orfeo in Orfeo ed Euridice (2009), the Princess in Suor Angelica (2007), Ulrica in Un Ballo in Maschera (2007-2008, 2012) and Zita in Gianni Schicchi (2007) among other roles.

In 2000 Blythe made her debut with the Seattle Opera as Fricka and the Second Norn in Wagner's Ring Cycle. She has since returned to Seattle frequently, portraying such roles as Amneris, Dame Quickly, Isabella in L'italiana in Algeri, Waltraute in Götterdämmerung, and the title role in Bizet's Carmen. In 2002 she made her debut at the Santa Fe Opera as Isabella in L'italiana in Algeri.

In November 2006, she starred in the world premiere of The Sailor-Boy and the Falcon, an opera based on "The Sailor-Boy's Tale" by Isak Dinesen. The work of SUNY Potsdam professors Paul Siskind (music) and Alan Steinberg (libretto), the opera was performed at the Sara M. Snell Theater of the Crane School of Music by the Crane School's Opera Ensemble.

In 2009 Blythe debuted at the San Francisco Opera portraying the role of Azucena in Il Trovatore. In 2010 she made her debut at the Lyric Opera of Chicago as Ulrica, and was also seen in Chicago that season as Katisha in The Mikado. The Chicago Sun-Times review of the latter performance stated, "Blythe explodes onto stage ... an enormous woman with enormous talent, a big, powerful voice and an elastic comic face". Chicago Classical Review added,

"Blythe ... steals the entire show. ... It’s unlikely that this supporting role has ever been sung with this caliber of gleaming operatic voice. She ... threw off the rapid-fire patter duet "There is beauty in the bellow of the blast" with blazing speed and crystal-clear diction. Blythe also displayed a great comedian’s timing making every punch line register. And, for a woman of such imposing physique, she showed herself a graceful and light-footed presence with her little victorious dance steps."

In 2011, Blythe premiered the solo mezzo-soprano role in John Corigliano's One Sweet Morning at Avery Fisher Hall for the New York Philharmonic, a composition commemorating the tenth anniversary of the September 11th Attacks.

On April 18, 2013, Blythe performed works made famous by Kate Smith on the PBS program Live from Lincoln Center - Celebration: Stephanie Blythe Meets Kate.

In June 2014, Blythe premiered the starring role of Gertrude Stein in Twenty-Seven, a new opera by Ricky Ian Gordon (music) and Royce Vavrek (libretto), commissioned for her by the Opera Theatre of Saint Louis.

Blythe has also performed roles with opera companies in Europe, including the Deutsche Oper Berlin, the Royal Opera, London and the Opéra National de Paris. Other companies she has sung with in the United States include Arizona Opera, Opera Boston, Pittsburgh Opera, and Tulsa Opera among others.

In the 2010s, Blythe started performing male roles under the drag persona "Blythely Oratonio", "a dramatic tenor with a naughty sense of humor and a storied operatic career who secretly always wanted to be a rock singer", as which she appears with a fake beard. Her male range is that of a tenor, overlapping with the lower end of a her mezzo-soprano voice. She has performed pieces from various genres including opera, rock, and musical theatre. In September 2021, she debuted as Don José in Carmen at the Chicago Opera Theater, with Jamie Barton in the title role. In a San Diego Opera production in 2023, she performed as a baritone for the first time, singing the title role of Gianni in Puccini's one-act comic opera Gianni Schicchi.

== Educator ==
Blythe has educated young singers across the country in master classes, some of which include appearances at the Curtis Institute of Music, the Juilliard School, the Manhattan School of Music, and the USC Thornton School of Music, among many others.

Blythe is on the faculty of the Tanglewood Music Center's Vocal Arts Program, at the summer home of the Boston Symphony, and the week-long vocal program known as the Fall Island Vocal Arts Seminar (which she founded in 2012 at her alma mater, SUNY Potsdam, Potsdam, New York).

In 2018, Blythe was appointed to be the Artistic Director of the Bard College Conservatory of Music Graduate Vocal Arts Program, succeeding Dawn Upshaw, VAP founder. She serves alongside Kayo Iwama, who is Associate Director.

== Honors and awards ==
- She received the prestigious Richard Tucker Music Foundation Award in 1999.
- SUNY Potsdam awarded her the degree of Doctor of Music honoris causa in 2006.
- In 2007, Blythe was an Opera News Award honoree, the youngest artist ever to receive this award.
