= Piano Concerto (Corigliano) =

1968 composition by John Corigliano

The Concerto for Piano and Orchestra is a piano concerto by the American composer John Corigliano. The work was commissioned by the San Antonio Symphony and was first performed on April 7, 1968, by the pianist Hilde Somer and the San Antonio Symphony under the direction of Victor Alessandro. The piece is dedicated to John Atkins.

== Music ==
The concerto has a duration of roughly 32 minutes and is composed in four movements:

1. Molto allegro
2. Scherzo
3. Andante appassionato
4. Allegro

The first movement is composed in sonata form. The third and fourth movements are played without pause.

The work is scored for solo piano and a large orchestra comprising three flutes (doubling piccolo) three oboes (doubling cor anglais), three clarinets (doubling bass clarinet), two bassoons, contrabassoon, four horns, three trumpets, three trombones, tuba, timpani, three percussionists, harp, and strings.

== Reception ==
Though the concerto was largely overlooked after its 1968 premiere, it has since grown in popularity. Corigliano himself was reportedly upset with the initial disinterest in the work, about which the music critic Stephen Wigler later wrote, "One can still understand Corigliano's distress. Here was a more than 30-minute-long concerto that promised satisfaction to virtuosos and audiences alike; and it was spiky enough in its Bartokian way to dispel the guilty pleasures that ensued from its sometimes Rachmaninoff-like, sometimes Mahler-like lyricism." Reviewing a 1996 recording of the work, Edward Greenfield of Gramophone called it "a powerful and ambitious work in four sharply contrasted movements" He continued:

The substantial opening Allegro, much the longest movement, is in modified sonata form, with a jazzy first subject prompting heavyweight virtuoso writing for the soloist, quickly leading to a broadly lyrical, meditative second theme. If Corigliano unashamedly uses a freely eclectic style, his writing is consistently positive and energetic, never merely conventional, both in that first movement and the compact scherzo, the lyrical Andante appassionato slow movement and the Rondo finale which follow.

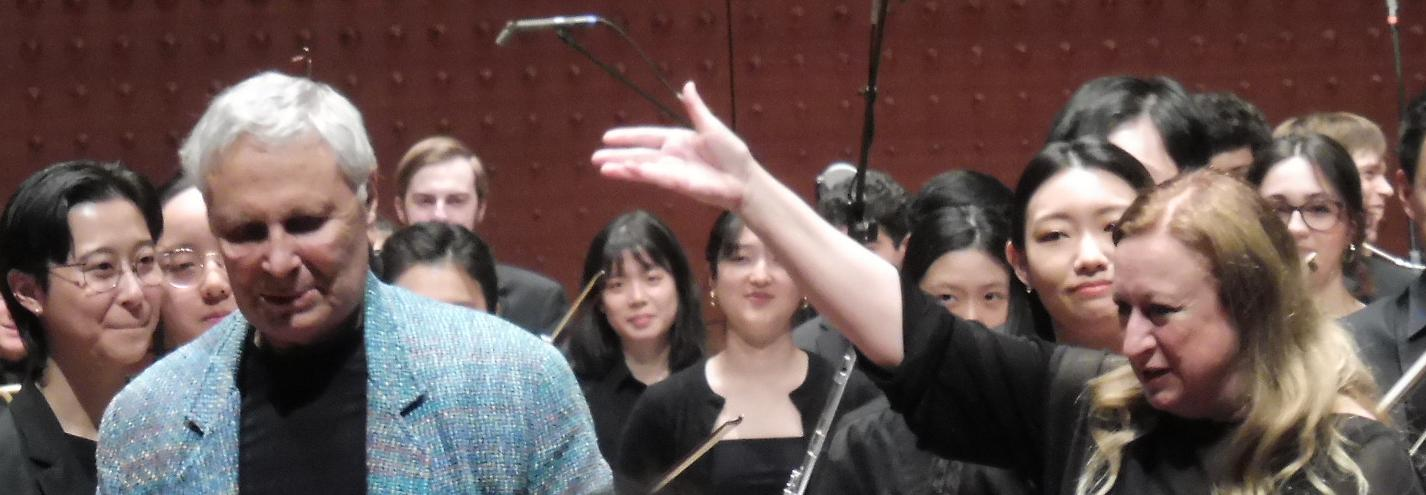
Corigliano and Simone Young at the Juilliard School's Piano Concerto Competition Finals in April 2023 in Alice Tully Hall

The concerto was part of the Juilliard School's 2023 Piano Concerto Competition Finals and was performed by the winner Jack Gao in a concert in the presence of Corigliano, conducted by Simone Young.

== Recordings ==
- Barry Douglas (piano), Leonard Slatkin (conductor), St. Louis Symphony Orchestra (1996)

== See also ==
- List of compositions by John Corigliano
