= Conjurer (composition) =

Percussion concerto by John Corigliano

Conjurer: Concerto for Percussionist and String Orchestra (with optional Brass) is a concerto for a solo percussionist and string orchestra by the American composer John Corigliano. The work was jointly commissioned for the percussionist Evelyn Glennie by the Pittsburgh Symphony Orchestra, the Nashville Symphony, the Royal Scottish National Orchestra, the Dallas Symphony Orchestra, the Calouste Gulbenkian Foundation, the Music Department (Lisbon), and the National Arts Centre Orchestra.

It was given its world premiere by Glennie and the Pittsburgh Symphony Orchestra under the direction of Marin Alsop in Pittsburgh on February 21, 2008.

== Music ==
Conjurer has a duration of roughly 35 minutes and is composed in three movements:

1. Wood
2. Metal
3. Skin

The title of each movement corresponds to the type of percussion instruments used in it. Corigliano thus employed such instruments as the marimba and wood block for the first movement, the vibraphone and chimes for the second, and timpani and bass drum for the third.

The work is scored for a solo percussionist and strings with an optional complement of brass, consisting of four horns, three trumpets, three trombones, and a tuba.

== Reception ==
Conjurer has been praised by music critics. Jeff Simon of The Buffalo News said it "seems so lacking in discomfort that it might have been something that came from a former fellow traveler of West Coast percussion experimentalists Lou Harrison, John Cage and Henry Cowell." David Bratman of the San Francisco Classical Voice wrote, "Percussion is so frequently used to punctuate loud passages in music that listeners may forget it can be used differently. Much of this concerto is actually fairly quiet, though the second movement rises to an agitated middle section. The finale, which is very loud indeed, nevertheless has a subdued section with a distant violin solo (the only such passage in the work) over quiet bass drum." Despite this, he also noted, "At 40 minutes, the work outstayed its welcome."

== Recording ==
A recording of Conjurer featuring Evelyn Glennie and the Albany Symphony Orchestra under David Alan Miller was released through Naxos Records on September 3, 2013. Glennie's performance on the album later won the 2014 Grammy Award for Best Classical Instrumental Solo.

== See also ==
- List of compositions by John Corigliano
