= Ziskin =

Ziskin is a Jewish Ashkenazi surname. Notable people with the surname include:

- James W. Ziskin (born 1960), American author
- Laura Ziskin (1950–2011), American film producer
- Louis Ziskin (born 1969), American CEO

== See also ==
- Susskind
- Ziskind
