= One Sweet Morning =

Song cycle for mezzo-soprano solo and orchestra

One Sweet Morning is a four-movement song cycle for mezzo-soprano solo and orchestra by the American composer John Corigliano. The work was jointly commissioned by the New York Philharmonic and the Shanghai Symphony Orchestra to commemorate the 10th anniversary of the September 11 attacks. It was given its world premiere on September 30, 2011, by the mezzo-soprano Stephanie Blythe and the New York Philharmonic under the conductor Alan Gilbert. The piece is dedicated to the memory of Natalie and Serge Koussevitzky.

== Composition ==
=== Background ===
The New York Philharmonic had once before approached Corigliano to compose a 9/11 tribute on the 1st anniversary of the attacks. The composer, believing the shock of the event to be too fresh, turned the commission down. The orchestra then approached the composer John Adams, whose piece On the Transmigration of Souls later won the 2002 Pulitzer Prize for Music.

Corigliano described the challenge of composing a 9/11 commemoration in the score program notes, writing:

...if I wrote a work that had meditative sections, but also dramatic and extroverted sections, then I would fall into a terrible trap. So many in the audience of this piece will have images of the frightful day itself—jet liners crashing into the World Trade Center, people jumping to their deaths from the top of the buildings, and the final collapse of the towers themselves—burned into their retinas. How can one hear music of any dramatic surges without imagining these events accompanying the music—or vice versa? Inevitably, the piece would become a tone poem of that unimaginable day – something I never intended and did not want. Yet how could I instruct the audience to ignore their own memories?

He continued:

Obviously, then, I needed to write a piece with words. I needed other images both to refute and complement the all-too-vivid ones we'd bring with us into the concert hall. But which images: and how would they pertain to the subject, as well as each other? The answer was as obvious as it was dispiriting. Ten years later, that day is more calmly remembered as just one in a continuum of terrible days. September 11th, 2001 was discrete and specific: but war and its anguishes have been with us forever. I needed a cycle of songs that would embed 9/11 into that larger story. So I chose four poems (one of them part of an epic poem) from different ages and countries.

=== Structure ===
One Sweet Morning has a duration of roughly 28 minutes and is composed in four movements:

1. A Song on the End of the World
2. Patroclus
3. War South of the Great Wall
4. One Sweet Morning

The first movement is set to the poem "A Song on the End of the World" by the Polish poet Czesław Miłosz. The second movement is set to a portion of Homer's Iliad detailing a massacre led by the Greek prince Patroclus. The third movement is set to the poem "War South of the Great Wall" by the 8th-century poet Li Po. The fourth and final movement is set to the eponymous anti-war poem "One Sweet Morning" by the American lyricist and poet E. Y. "Yip" Harburg.

=== Instrumentation ===
The work is scored for a solo mezzo-soprano and a large orchestra comprising three flutes (third doubling piccolo), three oboes, three clarinets (first and second doubling clarinet in A; third doubling bass clarinet and E-flat clarinet), three bassoons (third doubling contrabassoon), four horns, three trumpets, two trombones, bass trombone, tuba, timpani, four percussionists, piano (doubling celesta), harp, and strings.

== Reception ==
One Sweet Morning has been praised by music critics. Reviewing the world premiere, Anthony Tommasini of The New York Times wrote:

With a viscerally emotional score One Sweet Morning shifts in mood from ruminative to bellicose, from mystical to wrenching. Mr. Corigliano has long drawn from diverse styles to fashion his musical voice. Those who find the Romantic elements of his music excessive, as I sometimes do, may be put off by this work's cinematic stretches. But the skill and vision at play are impressive. And Ms. Blythe was in her glory.

Rob Cowan of Gramophone called it an "imposing song-cycle" and observed, "Writing it must have proved a challenging and in some respects unenviable task, given the need to balance the inevitable emotional imperative with a sense of distance necessary if durable art is going to be the outcome, which I think, in this case, it is." He added:

The trans-national texts used are by Czesław Miłosz, Homer, Li Po and EY Harburg, and the orchestral style ranges from sublime simplicity to the harrowing sounds of battle (in the Patroclus excerpt from Homer's Iliad) where post-Bergian resonances underline vivid parallels (and I mean this in the best sense) between Corigliano and the finest American film composers, for example Leonard Rosenman. Mezzo Stephanie Blythe’s performance of the premiere is strong and sonorous, while Alan Gilbert conducts a compelling account of Corigliano's multifaceted score.

Martin Bernheimer of the Financial Times, however, gave the piece a more mixed response, remarking:

Contrary to possible expectation, Corigliano wraps the diverse sentiments in compact orchestral fabrics, favouring dissonance over harmonic clarity, meandering Sprechgesang over melodic stability. His worthy intentions, unfortunately, are not invariably matched with lofty achievements. Much of One Sweet Morning sounds merely dense rather than tense. Cataclysms lose impact with repetition. The bright resolution emerges dark, a bit muddled and, yes, a bit forced.

== See also ==
- List of compositions by John Corigliano
