= Jack Gao =

Chinese classical pianist (born 2003)

Jack Gao 高阳
- Born: December 18, 2003 (age 22); Beijing, China
- Genres: Classical
- Occupation: Pianist
- Instrument: Piano
- Years active: 2010s–present

Jack (Yang) Gao (Chinese: 高阳; born 18 December 2003) is a Chinese classical pianist based in New York City. Gao first came to international attention after winning First Prize at the 2023 Walter W. Naumburg Foundation International Piano Competition and has since toured the globe as an artist, was a laureate of the Martha Argerich Steinway Prize in Hamburg, and won other major competitions worldwide.

== Early life and education ==
Gao was born in Beijing and started piano at the age of four. He attended the Middle School attached to the China Conservatory of Music, studying with Tianhong Tan and composer Xin Xie, and later worked with Huiqiao Bao, Xu Fei and Elmar Gasanov. Since 2022 he has studied at the Juilliard School in New York with Jerome Lowenthal and Emanuel Ax, where he also won the school's concerto competition.

== Career ==
Highlights include his Carnegie Hall debut recital in February 2024, a performance of John Corigliano's Piano Concerto with the Juilliard Orchestra conducted by Simone Young in Alice Tully Hall, and an invitation from Martha Argerich to appear as the second ever laureate of the Martha Argerich Steinway Prize at her 2025 festival in Hamburg.

== Awards and competitions ==
Year	Competition / Prize	Location	Result
2019	Steinway Junior Piano Competition	Beijing	Second Prize
2023	Gina Bachauer Piano Competition (Juilliard)	New York, USA	First Prize
2023	Walter W. Naumburg International Piano Competition	New York, USA	First Prize
2024	Munz Piano Competition	New York, USA	First Prize
2025	Bösendorfer & Yamaha USASU International Piano Competition	Tempe, USA	Second Prize + Sangyoung Kim Special Award
2025	Martha Argerich Steinway Prize	Hamburg, Germany	Laureate
