= Ziskind =

Ziskind is a Jewish Ashkenazi surname meaning sweet child. Notable people with the surname include:

- Alexander Ziskind Maimon (1809–1887), Lithuanian rabbi
- Haim Ziskind (born 1990), Israeli footballer
- Tamar Ziskind (born 1985), Israeli beauty pageant contestant
- Trudi Ziskind (born 1946), known professionally as Trudi Ames, American actor

== See also ==
- Ziskin
- Susskind
