= Süßkind von Trimberg =

German-language author

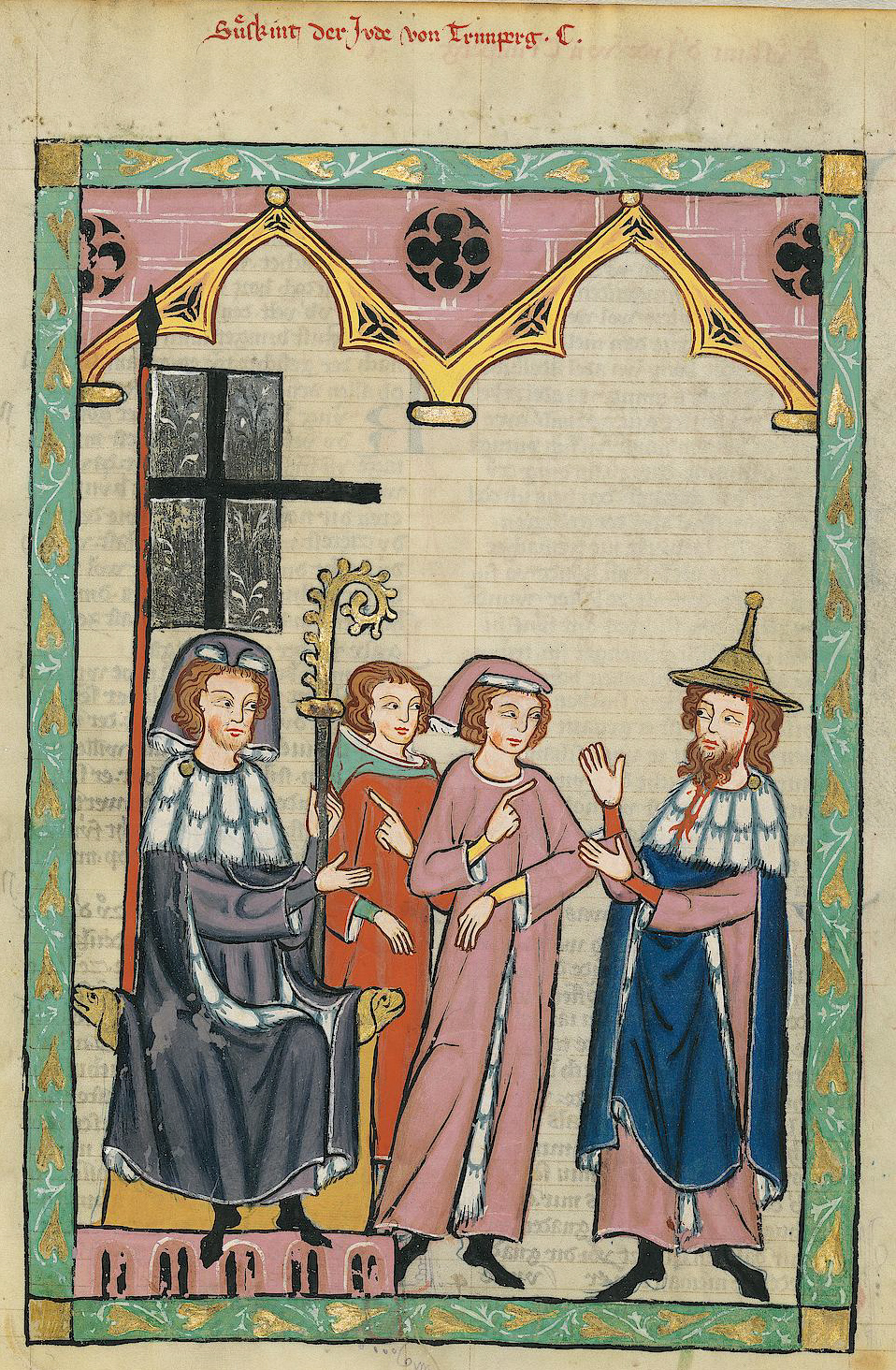
Süßkind, der Jude von Trimberg (Süsskind, the Jew of Trimberg), portrait from the Codex Manesse.

Süßkind von Trimberg (or Suesskind of Trimberg) is given as the author of six poems in the Codex Manesse. The poems date to the second half of the 13th century, and if their purported author is historical, he would be the first documented Jewish poet of the German language.

The town of Trimberg is today part of the Elfershausen municipality, in Lower Franconia, Bavaria, at the time within the Bishopric of Würzburg.

== Historicity ==
There are no records about Suesskind's life and not even proof that the poems recorded under his name are from a single author. Yet Suesskind (Süßkind) was a specifically Jewish name, and the spelling of the poems corresponds to an author raised in the Rhinelands, where Suesskind is alleged to have come from. There is a Jewish motive in V,2, where the poet proclaims his intention to leave the courtly sphere and live humbly "in the manner of old Jews", possible allusions to Hebrew prayers in I,3. and, while wandering minstrels generally were unmarried, the poet praises his wife in III,2 and sings of the hunger of his children in V,1, which, if based on facts, would correspond to the Jewish religious obligation to marry and propagate. Written between 1250 and 1300, the poems were incorporated into the collection around 1330, when memories of their possible author could have still been prevalent.

== Frontispiece ==
The frontispiece preceding Süßkind's works in the Codex Manesse (which is not to be taken as a portrait in the modern sense) identifies him as a Jew by means of a characteristically pointed Judenhut (the headgear which Jews were required to wear by law in the later German Middle Ages) and a long curled beard, also frequently associated with Jews. Though Süßkind refers to himself as an impoverished, itinerant minstrel in his verses, the painter depicts him wearing an expensive fur-lined cloak. The poet stands before a seated dignitary who is either a bishop or an abbot: he carries a crozier but lacks a mitre. This figure is enthroned under a standard which is variously said to be the flag of the town of Constance (whose bishop was closely associated with the codex), of Fulda (near Frankfurt/Main) or of the archbishop of Cologne. Two additional figures serve as intermediaries. All four figures gesticulate animatedly, denoting a lively exchange of words.

The subject of their discourse is a matter of controversy. It has been interpreted as a recitation of verse by the poet before an episcopal audience; a legal proceeding between Süßkind and two Christians presided over by the bishop; or a theological debate between Christianity and Judaism.

== Poems ==
While most of the content of Codex Manesse is Minnesang, Suesskind was not a minnesinger, his poems belonging to the more general category of medieval Spruchdichtung.

He sang of the worth of the virtuous wife (III,2), and of the hunger and misery of his children (V,1). There are possible allusions to Hebrew prayers and benedictions in his texts, as in I,3, where his comparison of the briefness of man's days and his salvation through God correspond to the 33rd benediction said on the eve of the Jewish New Year. He stated that nobility – and this at the high time of chivalry, in a collection where every singer of remotely noble descent is portrayed with a coat of arms – is not dependent on birth, but on one's deeds: “Nobility is not dependent on a piece of paper / Who acts nobly, him will I account noble.”

In one of the last poems in the Codex (V,2) he bitterly complains that he fooled himself with his attempts to be an artist ("Ich var ûf der tôren vart / mit mîner künste zwâre"), that he is now determined to let his grey beard grow long and henceforth go his way humbly as a Jew, wrapped in a long coat, his hat pulled deep in his face, and won't sing any chivalrous ("hovelîchen") song, since the noblemen ("herren") won't grant him any further support.

The most characteristic of his poems is the Fable of the Wolf, where a wolf complains about his bad reputation, and argues that he is innocent because he is forced to steal geese to survive, while the false man does much greater damage.

== Modern reception ==
As the only Jewish poet of the Codex Manesse, Suesskind was the subject of particular attention in scholarship since the 18th century. His historicity was controversially debated, his poems were translated into modern German and into Polish. Gerhardt (1997) is a summary of the history of the modern reception of the Suesskind poems.

Friedrich Torberg wrote a fictionalized biography of the poet, entitled Süsskind von Trimberg (Frankfurt am Main: Fischer, 1972).

== References and further reading ==
- Gerhardt, Dietrich. Süsskind von Trimberg. Berichtigungen zu einer Erinnerung. Lang, Bern u.a. 1997, ISBN 3-906757-01-3
- Hausmann, Albrecht. "Das Bild zu Süßkind von Trimberg in der Manessischen Liederhandschrift." In Kulturen der Manuskriptzeitalters. Ergebnisse der amerikanisch-Deutschen Arbeitstagung an der Georg-August-Üniversität Göttingen vom 17. bis 20. Oktober 2002, eds. Arthur Groos and Hans-Jochen Schiewer, 87-112. Göttingen: V&R unipress, 2004.
- Jahrmärker, Manuela. “Die Miniatur Süßkinds von Trimberg in der Manessischen Liederhandschrift.” Euphorion 81 (1987): 330-346.
- Jewish Encyclopedia
- Allgemeine Deutsche Biographie, xxxvii.334-336.
