= Alan Steinberg =

American novelist

Alan L. Steinberg (1944 - 2023) was an American author.

He wrote the libretto for the opera The Falcon and the Sailor Boy, which was composed by Paul Siskind. The opera was performed at SUNY Potsdam in 2006 and starred Steinberg's former rhetoric student Stephanie Blythe.

== Education and career ==
Steinberg earned a B.A. in English from the University of Hartford in 1965 and an M.A. in English from Washington State University in 1967. He taught writing and literature courses at Wenatchee Community College in central Washington for five years. He earned his PhD from Carnegie Mellon University in English in 1975, submitting a collection of original poems entitled Ceremonies as his dissertation.

Steinberg was a Professor in SUNY Potsdam's English department, where he also served as the coordinator of the writing program. He taught courses in rhetoric and writing, creative writing, and professional writing. He was well known among master's students for his course on the Western film and novel genres. Steinberg previously taught at Paul Smith's College, Marist College and Idaho State University.

Steinberg wrote of his own travels and teaching: "I was born and raised in New York City, then lived and taught for a number of years in the mountains of Idaho and Washington, and now have learned to love the North Country [New York] as a place of rugged beauty and challenge. I teach a variety of writing and literature courses, all with the aim of helping students appreciate the beauty and power of a story well-told whether that story is found in the Old Testament, in the Odyssey, in Shane, or in the students' next assignment."

== Works ==
Steinberg published his first full-length stage play, The Road to Corinth, with Players Press in 1984. His debut collection of short fiction, Divided (Aegina Press), appeared in 1996, followed the next year by his novel about an introspective circus “freak,” Cry of the Leopard (St. Martin's Press). His second collection of poetry, fathering (Sarasota Poetry Theater Press), was published in 2000. Throughout his career, Steinberg also published essays, stories, poems, and dramatic pieces in more than fifty venues, garnering numerous regional and national prizes for them. His work appeared in these journals, among many others: Bellevue Literary Review, Blueline Magazine, Carolina Quarterly, Louisville Review, Poem, William & Mary Review, Wisconsin Review.

Steinberg was the librettist, with composer Paul Siskind, of the opera The Sailor-Boy and the Falcon, which premiered in 2006 at SUNY Potsdam.
