= Richard Susskind =

British legal scholar and consultant (born 1961)

Richard Susskind CBE KC FRSE FRSA FBCS
- Born: 28 March 1961 (age 65); Paisley, Scotland
- Education: University of Glasgow (LL.B.); Balliol College, Oxford (D.Phil.)
- Known for: The Grid
- Awards: OBE (2000); Honorary Fellow of Law Faculty, Durham University (2001); Honorary Professor, Gresham College, London (2005)
- Scientific career
- Fields: Law; Information technology
- Workplaces: Gresham College; University of Oxford; Strathclyde University

Richard Eric Susskind (born 28 March 1961) is a British author, speaker, and independent adviser to international professional firms and national governments. He is the IT adviser to the Lord Chief Justice of England and Wales, holds professorships at the University of Oxford, Gresham College and Strathclyde University, is a past chair of the Advisory Panel on Public Sector Information, and is the president of the Society for Computers and Law.

Susskind has specialised in legal technology since the early 1980s, has authored nine books and is a regular columnist at The Times. Susskind has more recently furthered his research to cover the professions more generally and his latest book, co-authored with Daniel Susskind, his son, predicts the decline of today's professions and describes the people and systems that will replace them. They argue that the current professions are antiquated and no longer affordable and explain how 'increasingly capable systems' will fundamentally change the way that professional expertise is shared. They propose six models for producing and distributing expertise in society.

== Early life and education ==
The son of Werner and Shirley Susskind, he was privately educated at the Hutchesons' Grammar School. In 1978, he went to the University of Glasgow where he received an LL.B. degree in Law in 1983. He subsequently obtained a D.Phil. in Computers and Law from Balliol College, Oxford in 1986.

== Online dispute resolution ==
Susskind chairs the UK Civil Justice Council's Advisory Group for online dispute resolution, which published a report in February 2015 recommending the establishment of Her Majesty's Online Courts (HMOC). The report recommends HMOC consist of three tiers: online evaluation, online facilitation and online judges. According to the report, the benefits of HMOC would be an increase in access to justice and substantial savings in the cost of the court system.

== Honours ==
Susskind has received several honours and distinctions. In 1992, he was named an honorary member of the Society for Computers and Law, and in the same year, elected a Fellow of the Royal Society of Arts (FRSA). In 1997, he was elected a Fellow of the Royal Society of Edinburgh (FRSE) and a Fellow of the British Computer Society (FBCS). In the 2000 New Year Honours, he was appointed an Officer of the Order of the British Empire (OBE) by Queen Elizabeth II "for his contributions to the use of IT in law and the administration of justice". In 2001, Susskind was made an honorary fellow of the law faculty at Durham University and in 2005, appointed honorary professor at Gresham College, London. In the 2025 New Year Honours, Susskind was promoted to a Commander of the Order of the British Empire (CBE) by King Charles III "for services to Information Technology and to the Law".

== Family ==
In 1985, Susskind married Michelle Latter. They have three children: Daniel, Jamie and Alexandra. Daniel Susskind, his co-author of The Future of the Professions, is an economics lecturer at Balliol College, Oxford; Jamie Susskind is a barrister and the author of Future Politics and The Digital Republic, which also examine the future of technology.

== Books ==
- Expert Systems in Law (Oxford University Press, 1987; paperback, 1989)
- Latent Damage Law – The Expert System (Butterworths, 1988) (with P.N. Capper)
- Essays on Law and Artificial Intelligence (Tano, 1993)
- The Future of Law (Oxford University Press, 1996; revised paperback, 1998)
- Transforming the Law (Oxford University Press, 2000; revised paperback, 2003)
- The Susskind Interviews (Sweet & Maxwell, 2005)
- The End of Lawyers? (Oxford University Press, 2008; revised paperback, 2010)
- Tomorrow's Lawyers: An Introduction to Your Future (Oxford University Press, paperback 2013)
- The Future of the Professions: How Technology Will Transform the Work of Human Experts (Oxford University Press, 2015) (with D. Susskind)
- Online Courts and the Future of Justice (Oxford University Press, 2019)
- How To Think About AI: A Guide For The Perplexed (Oxford University Press, 2025)
