= Jerome Bunke =

American clarinetist (born 1945)

- Born: September 8, 1945 (age 80); Albany, New York, U.S.
- Genres: Classical
- Occupations: clarinetist, record producer
- Instrument: Clarinet

Jerome Bunke (born on September 8, 1945, in Albany, New York) is a clarinetist and record producer. He has participated as a soloist and chamber musician with various music organizations, including the Japan Philharmonic Orchestra, the Yomiuri Nippon Symphony Orchestra, the Martha Graham Dance Company, and the Lake George Opera, which is now known as Opera Saratoga. In his role as a producer, Bunke is recognized for curating the Heritage Collection, an archive that preserves live and recorded performances by Stanley Drucker, who served as the Principal Clarinetist of the New York Philharmonic.

== Early life and education ==
Bunke was born on September 8, 1945, in Albany, New York. He completed his education at The Milne School, which is affiliated with SUNY-Albany, and later attended the Juilliard School as a scholarship student, where he obtained both Bachelor of Music and Master of Science degrees. Additionally, he earned a Ph.D. from New York University as a Collins Scholar. Bunke studied clarinet under the instruction of Stanley Drucker and Leon Russianoff.

== Career ==
Bunke made his solo concert debut in New York in 1968 after winning the Concert Artists Guild Award, subsequently serving as the director of the organization. He later held a teaching position at New York University, where he was honored with the Founders Day Award. Bunke also became an Affiliate Artist at the Conservatory of Music at the University of Missouri–Kansas City. He served as the Principal Clarinetist for the Lake George Opera and played clarinet while managing the orchestra for the Martha Graham Dance Company. Additionally, as a founding member of The Ariel Ensemble, he participated in the release of classical music recordings and toured extensively across the United States.

He has performed as a soloist and chamber musician at various notable venues, including Carnegie Hall, Town Hall, Merkin Concert Hall, Lincoln Center, the Brooklyn Academy of Music, The Greenwich Mews Theater, the Kennedy Center, and the Wisconsin Union Theater. His international engagements include a tour of Japan, where he made solo concerto appearances and participated in television broadcasts with the Japan Philharmonic Orchestra, the NHK Symphony Orchestra, and the Yomiuri Nippon Symphony Orchestra.

Bunke is recognized for premiering works by a number of contemporary composers during his playing career. Among these composers are Robert Starer, Paul Harvey, Katherine Hoover, Seymour Barab, Richard Lane, Jack Gottlieb, Michael Cohen, William Mayer, Loretta Jankowski, Elliott Schwartz, Lanny Meyers, and John Freeman. He also performed the Carnegie Hall premiere of Olivier Messiaen's Quatuor pour la fin du temps.

In 1994, He established Digital Force, a multimedia company that has participated in various projects, including Broadway cast recordings, classical music organizations, and recordings for both independent and commercial artists. Since 2017, he has produced 14 volumes of the Stanley Drucker Heritage Collection, which is a compilation of live and studio recordings featuring Stanley Drucker.

== Discography ==
Producer Discography
Year	Release Title	Record Label	Artist	Formate
2017	Heritage Collection: Live In Concert (1-5)	Clover Field Recordings	Stanley Drucker	CD
2019	Heritage Collection: From The Vaults (6-7)	Clover Field Recordings	Stanley Drucker	CD
2022	Heritage Collection: Hidden Gems (8-9)	Clover Field Recordings	Stanley Drucker	CD
2022	Duo Tonic	Recklessly Romantic Productions	James Graseck	CD
2022	The Finishing Touch	Recklessly Romantic Productions	James Graseck	CD
2024	Heritage Collection: Coda (10-14)	Clover Field Recordings	Stanley Drucker	CD

Clarinet Discography
Year	Release Title	Record Label	Formate
1965	The Ariel Ensemble Performs Barab, Gottleib, Stater, Vaughan-Williams and Schubert	Orion / Baroque Records	LP / Digital
1973	Music for Clarinet	Music Minus One	LP
1973	Laureate Series	Music Minus One	CD
1974	Three Centuries of Clarinet	Music Heritage Society	LP
1975	Music For Clarinet And Piano	Music Heritage Society	LP
1975	Four Cycles of Vocal and Instrumental Chamber Music	Music Heritage Society	LP
1977	Music Minus One Clarinet	Music Heritage Society	LP
1981	Quintet for Oboe and Strings: 12 Bagatelles for Piano Overture for Clarinet	Capstone Records	CD / LP
1991	Elliott Schwartz	Composers Recordings	CD
2004	Schumann - 3 Fantasy Pieces, Op. 73, 3 Romances, Op. 94	Music Minus One	CD
2004	Weber & Baermann - Grand Duo Concertant & Adagio	Music Minus One	CD
2009	The Composers Festival Orchestra	Trilogy Records	CD / LP / Digital
2015	Music For Clarinet And Piano	Clover Field Recordings	CD / Digital
2017	The Vocal Clarinet	Clover Field Recordings	CD / Digital
