= Mariano Siskind =

Argentine writer

Mariano Siskind (Buenos Aires, 1972) is an Argentine writer, scholar and poet. He is currently Professor of Romance Languages and Literatures and of Comparative Literature at Harvard University in Cambridge, Massachusetts.

He grew up in Almagro, Buenos Aires, near the Abasto Shopping mall. He worked as a journalist in Buenos Aires for several years and then moved to New York City to pursue his Ph.D. in Comparative Literature at New York University.

Siskind published the novel Historia del Abasto (Beatriz Viterbo Editora, 2007) and the poetry collection The Modernist Songbook (Beatriz Viterbo Editora, 2021). In his literary works, he frequently deals with problems regarding displacement, cosmopolitanism, translation between languages, and the incorporation of world literature within the Argentine tradition.

As a scholar, Siskind works with nineteenth- and twentieth-century Latin American literature, travel writing, histories and theories of globalization and cosmopolitanism, Marxism and psychoanalysis. With Sylvia Molloy, he co-edited the volume Poéticas de la distancia: Adentro y afuera de la literatura Argentina (2006, Norma). He has also co-edited the volume World Literature, Cosmopolitanism, Globality with Gesine Müller (De Gruyter, 2019) and translated Homi K. Bhabha to Spanish in the volume Nuevas Minorías, Nuevos Derechos (Siglo XXI, 2013).

In 2013, he published the monograph Cosmopolitan Desires: Global Modernity and World Literature in Latin America (Northwestern University Press). David Damrosch, professor at Harvard University, called it a "probing and highly original study," in which Siskind "stages a fascinating confrontation between peripheral cosmopolitanism and the discourse of world literature, both in modernist literary culture and in today's academic study." The book won an Honorable mention at the Latin American Studies Association (LASA), Southern Cone Section Book Prize.

Controversies

In 2019 he was also responsible of notifying ethnic studies scholar Lorgia García Peña that her tenure was denied by Harvard University even though he later stated that he disagreed with that decision in a high-profile case that sparked media outrage and protests against a possibly discriminatory decision against Latinas
