= Soskin =

Soskin (masculine, Russian: Соскин) or Soskina (feminine, Russian: Соскина) is a Russian surname. Notable people with the surname include:

- Betty Reid Soskin (1921–2025), American ranger
- Mark Soskin (born 1953), American jazz pianist
- Gary Soskin (born 1946), American/Swiss Photographer
- Paul Soskin (1905–1975), Russian–born English screenwriter and film producer
- Renee Soskin (1916–1998), British teacher and politician
- Selig Soskin (1873–1959), Israeli agronomist
