= Vocalise (Corigliano) =

Vocalise is a composition for soprano, electronics, and orchestra by the American composer John Corigliano. The work was commissioned by the New York Philharmonic under the direction of Kurt Masur with financial contributions from the Francis Goelet Fund. It was given its world premiere by the soprano Sylvia McNair and the New York Philharmonic under Masur at Avery Fisher Hall on November 11, 1999. The piece is dedicated to McNair.

== Composition ==
Vocalise is composed in a single movement and has a duration of roughly 20 minutes.

=== Background ===
The music was commissioned by Masur and the New York Philharmonic for a program of all new music commemorating the new millennium titled "Messages for the Millennium." Corigliano used the opportunity of the commission to illustrate the evolution of music through the past millennium. In a pre-concert interview with Anthony Tommasini of The New York Times, Corigliano explained, "It starts with the first instrument, the voice, first humming, then intoning. Then the percussion, the oldest instruments, enter. As the orchestra grows, a kind of progression of materials unfolds. But they are the same materials, treated differently." The ensemble is later joined by the electronic elements, which provide the "only contribution to sound of the 20th century." He added, "I didn't want a piece where electronics, like an upstart, are used to shake things up. I wanted them to add to the beauty of the orchestra."

=== Instrumentation ===
The work is scored for a soprano, electronics, and a large orchestra consisting of three flutes (3rd doubling piccolo), two oboes, three clarinets (3rd doubling bass clarinet), two bassoons, four horns, four trumpets (all offstage; 2nd doubling piccolo trumpet; 2nd and 3rd playing crotales; 4th playing glockenspiel), two trombones, bass trombone, optional tuba, timpani, four percussionists, piano (doubling celesta), harp, and strings.

== Reception ==
Vocalise has received a mixed response from music critics. Reviewing the world premiere program "Messages for the Millennium," James R. Oestreich wrote, "John Corigliano's Vocalise, well rendered by the soprano Sylvia McNair, was intended to show the development of musical complexity over the millennium, from the unadorned human voice to electronic sound. It might just as well have shown the triumph of effects over music. Although this piece seemed politely to honor Mr. Masur's specifications, there seemed little concern for the project's underlying humanism." Peter G. Davis of New York similarly observed, "Apparently Corigliano wrote his Vocalise to suggest ways in which electronics may affect the future of musical performance by altering the acoustical properties of the human voice (here soprano Sylvia McNair) and a symphony orchestra. It's not exactly an innovative concept -- Edgard Varèse did it all 45 years ago -- and Vocalise came off as a pretty crude piece of work, more a random collection of sound effects than music of substance."

Conversely, Jeff Simon of The Buffalo News called it "a marvelous 21-minute" work and opined, "'I wanted to write a piece for electronics that was beautiful to hear.' And so it is."
