= Symphony No. 1 (Corigliano) =

1988 symphony by John Corigliano

- by John Corigliano
- Key: A
- Period: Contemporary
- Form: Symphony
- Composed: 1988–1989
- Duration: About 40 minutes
- Movements: 4
- Scoring: Orchestra

Premiere
- Date: March 15, 1990
- Location: Symphony Center, Chicago
- Conductor: Daniel Barenboim

John Corigliano's Symphony No. 1 for orchestra was written between 1988 and 1989 during the composer's tenure as the first composer-in-residence for the Chicago Symphony Orchestra. The symphony's first performance was by the Chicago Symphony conducted by Daniel Barenboim on March 15, 1990.

== Instrumentation ==
The symphony is scored for piccolo, 3 flutes, 3 oboes, English horn, 3 clarinets in Bb (doubling Contrabass and Eb), bass clarinet, 3 bassoons, contrabassoon, 6 horns in F, 5 trumpets in C, 4 trombones (2 tenor, 2 bass), 2 tubas, 2 sets of timpani, percussion (glockenspiel, crotales, vibraphone, xylophone, marimba, chimes (2 sets), snare drum, 3 tom-toms, 3 roto-toms, field drum, tenor drum, 2 bass drums, suspended cymbal, tamtam, finger cymbals, 3 temple blocks, tambourine, anvil, metal plate with hammer, brake drum, triangle, flexatone, police whistle, whip, ratchet), harp, piano, and strings.

== Composition ==
Prior to this work, Corigliano had “long resisted the notion of a contemporary symphony ... for what he felt was its egotistical elevation of the composer’s need to express himself over the needs of the performer or audiences”. However, the loss of numerous friends due to the emerging AIDS pandemic brought Corigliano to use the symphonic form not as a means of personal expression but to commemorate “‘my friends – those I had lost and the one I was losing’”.

Inspired in part by the NAMES Project AIDS Memorial Quilt, the symphony seeks to memorialize friends and colleagues in Corigliano’s life. The first three movements are dedicated to three individuals: a pianist, a music executive, and a cellist. The finale depicts the piano solo, the tarantella melody, and the cello solo from the first three movements against a backdrop of “a repeated pattern consisting of waves of brass chords ... [to convey] an image of timelessness”.

== Form ==
"Apologue: Of Rage and Remembrance" is the first of the four movements in Symphony No. 1 and written in a loose A-B-A form that "alternates between the tension of anger and the bittersweet nostalgia of remembering".

The movement opens with "the nasal open A of the violins and violas" and explores the different timbres of that note by being played on different strings while varying the speed of vibrato as the note "grows in intensity and volume until it is answered by a burst of percussion". This then ushers in the entrance of the orchestra in cacophonous overlapping passages of various woodwind and brass instruments. The piece intensifies with increasing dynamic and tempo to a climax, from which the violins take over in the very upper range of their register, thus beginning the B section.

As the violins descend, in a calmer and more peaceful mood, an offstage piano enters with Leopold Godowsky's transcription of Isaac Albéniz's Tango in D. The lyrical melody, first played by solo woodwind instruments and then by strings, carries a much more nostalgic mood. The “chattering brass motives” from the A section begin to reappear for increasing lengths of time until it takes over, thus bringing the end of this section.

The dissonant motives accumulate with increasing speed until the orchestra reaches a standstill with loud, repeating dissonant chords played by the entire ensemble, pulsating for long stretches of time. These pulses eventually diminuendo with a lower frequency to a piano. A recapitulation of the motives from the beginning of the piece reach a final climax to conclude the movement, as the strings linger on a high A.

== Reception ==
The symphony has been well received by the public and by critics. Many orchestras have performed this symphony since its premiere, and it has also been choreographed by the Milwaukee Ballet.

The symphony has received numerous awards, including the Grawemeyer Award for Music Composition in 1991, the Grammy Award for Best Orchestral Performance and for Best New Composition in 1991, and the Grammy Award for Best Classical Album in 1996.

== Notable recordings ==
- Daniel Barenboim conducting the Chicago Symphony Orchestra
- Leonard Slatkin conducting the National Symphony Orchestra (United States)
- Tatsuya Shimono conducting the Yomiuri Nippon Symphony Orchestra (Japan)
