= The Billion Dollar Band =

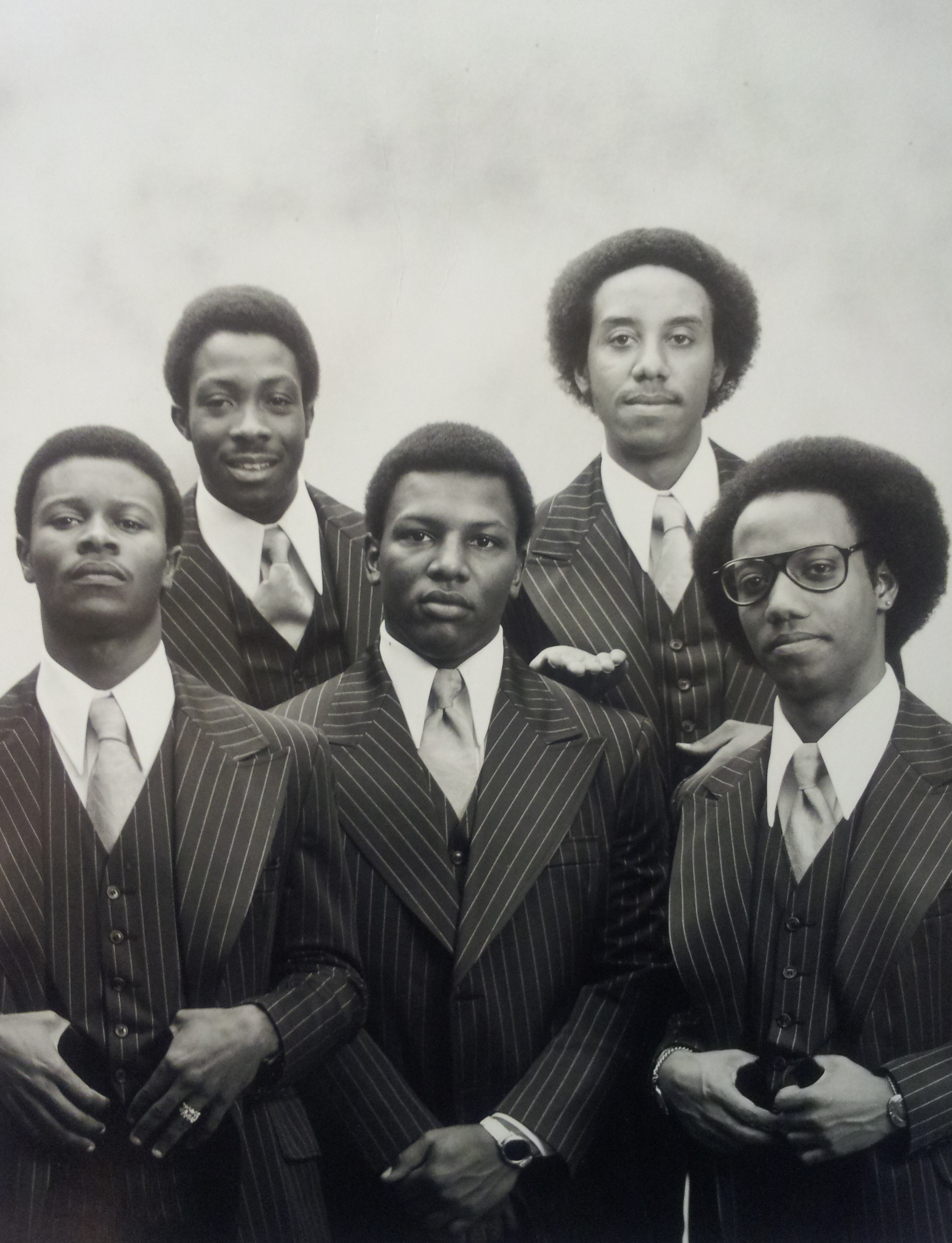
The Billion Dollar Band

The Billion Dollar Band is a five-member African American '70s soul/funk/rock/R&B musical group born out of Miami, Florida. As a one-hit wonder group, they were released on the Miami Criteria's Sound Studios record label, Good Sounds.

Vernon Maddox died from a stroke on July 17, 1996, at the age of 40.

== Line-up ==
The original Billion Dollar Band members are:

- Roosevelt Demps (drummer/vocalist)
- Winston Stubbs (trumpet/vocalist)
- Reginald Showers (trombone/vocalist)
- Charles N. Harris Jr. (bassist/vocalist)
- Vernon Maddox (lead vocalist/guitarist)

== Discography ==
Their ten-song album release included the songs:

- Money Don't Grow On Trees
- Get In The Groove
- I Like What You're Doin'
- Candy Girl
- Love's Sweet Notions
- Our Love
- Without Your Love
- Smiling Morning Love
- Big Time Spender
- Let's Just Be Friends

It was released worldwide on the CBS, Epic, and RCA record labels in 1978.
