= Clarinet Concerto (Corigliano) =

1977 composition by John Corigliano

The Concerto for Clarinet and Orchestra is a clarinet concerto in three movements by the American composer John Corigliano. The work was commissioned by the New York Philharmonic for the clarinetist Stanley Drucker. It was composed in the summer and fall of 1977 and was first performed in New York City on December 6, 1977, by Drucker and the New York Philharmonic conducted by Leonard Bernstein. The composition is dedicated to Drucker and Bernstein.

== Composition ==
=== Background ===
Corigliano described the inspiration for the Clarinet Concerto in the score program notes, writing:

My associations as a child – attending rehearsals and performances with my father, who was then the concertmaster of the [New York] Philharmonic – gave me the opportunity of getting to know many of the men in the orchestra both as artists and friends. This feeling of intimacy governed my decision to make sure that my first work for the Philharmonic utilized the entire orchestra. I was aware that, with a wind concerto, this is a potentially dangerous thing to do – to solve problems of balance most such pieces are discreetly scored for small ensembles – but it provided me with a fascinating challenge.

He continued:

My regard for the musicians of the Philharmonic also shaped their role in the accompaniment to this Concerto. In the concerto, each player has a chance to display solo virtuosity; often the work approaches being a concerto for orchestra in its demands. The soloist, Stanley Drucker, was first clarinetist of the Philharmonic in my youth. Knowing his special gifts enabled me to write music of unprecedented difficulty for the solo instrument, and gave me the idea that generates the first movement; the opening cadenza.

Corigliano later recalled, "When I showed Stanley the first movement of the concerto, it was the only time I've ever seen him in his life look terrified. But I showed him his part, and his eyes got very big. And he said, 'How am I gonna play this?' And then he started playing it and, of course, in no time at all, he found that he could not only play it, but that it sounded like a million dollars when he did."

=== Music ===
The piece has a duration of roughly 30 minutes and is composed in three movements:

1. Cadenzas
2. Elegy
3. Antiphonal Toccata

The first movement consists of two cadenzas separated by an interlude, subtitled "Ignis fatuus" (Will-o'-the-wisp) and "Corona solis" (corona of the sun).

The second movement was composed in memory Corigliano's father John Corigliano Sr., a former concertmaster of the New York Philharmonic who died in 1975.

The third movement was composed as Corigliano's "solution to the balance problems created by using the full orchestra in a wind concerto"; this movement features a number of antiphonal performers and quotes the Italian composer Giovanni Gabrieli's 1597 composition Sonata pian' e forte.

The work is scored for solo clarinet and an orchestra comprising three flutes, piccolo, three oboes, cor anglais, two additional clarinets, bass clarinet, three bassoons, contrabassoon, six French horns, four trumpets, three trombones, tuba, timpani, three percussionists, harp, piano, and strings.

== Reception ==
Jeff Lunden of NPR called the clarinet concerto "a fiendishly difficult work". A. Ashby of Gramophone described the piece as "full to bursting with antiphony and visual spectacle" and specifically lauded the third movement, saying it "has a poise and sense of shape that fairly take the breath away". The music critic Peter Dickinson said it "impressed a wide audience" and similarly wrote of the final movement, "The finale ('Antiphonal Toccata') is consistently energetic, with a spectacular passage for timpani and a spacious chorale that unifies the movement."

== See also ==
- List of compositions by John Corigliano
