= Symphony No. 2 (Corigliano) =

Pulitzer Prize-winning symphony by John Corigliano

John Corigliano's Symphony No. 2 for Orchestra was commissioned by the Boston Symphony Orchestra to celebrate the 100th anniversary of Symphony Hall. The symphony's first performance was by the Boston Symphony Orchestra conducted by Seiji Ozawa on November 30, 2000.

== Music ==
The symphony is scored for string orchestra (minimum 6 first violins, 5 second violins, 4 violas, 4 cellos, and 2 basses).

The piece consists of five movements:

1. Prelude
2. Scherzo
3. Nocturne
4. Fugue
5. Postlude

== Composition ==
Based on his String Quartet (1995). As Corigliano explains: "My quartet is in five movements, three of which are notated in spatial notation. This means that the players do not count beats, but play more freely rhythmically, coordinating at various points but totally independent in others." This approach had to be adapted -along with other aspects of the piece- to suit a larger ensemble.

== Reception ==
The piece was awarded the 2001 Pulitzer Prize for Music.

== Notable recordings ==
- Yuli Turovsky conducting the I Musici de Montreal
- John Storgards conducting the Helsinki Philharmonic
