= Jamie Susskind =

English barrister and author

Jamie Susskind (born 1989) is an English barrister and author.

== Background ==
Jamie Susskind is the son of Richard Susskind, a notable British author, and is Jewish. He grew up in Radlett, an affluent village in Hertfordshire, and received a private school education from the Haberdashers' Boys' School. Jamie was Head Boy, as well as captain of the debating team and member of the golf team. He studied history and politics at Oxford University. He later studied law and was appointed as a research fellow at the Berkman Klein Center for Internet and Society at Harvard University. As of 2018, Jamie practised law at Littleton Chambers.

As of 2020, Susskind was engaged to his partner Joanna Hardy, a criminal barrister.

== Future Politics: Living in a World Transformed by Tech ==
Susskind's 2019 book Future Politics: Living Together in a World Transformed by Tech, approaches the issues of technological change in the political arena from a legal standpoint, speculating on the various ways technology would change the interactions between citizens and the political process. It was awarded Book of the Year by Evening Standard and Prospect Magazine, Book of the Day by The Guardian and received the 2019 Estoril Global Issues Distinguished Book Prize. It was also listed by London School of Economics as one of top ten books of 2019.

== The Digital Republic: On Freedom and Democracy in the 21st Century ==
His 2022 book, The Digital Republic: On Freedom and Democracy in the 21st Century, discusses the dangers, problems, and solutions to Big Tech. He calls for using representative deliberative groups in making major decisions. John Naughton finds that "Susskind’s gift for exposition means that the reader rarely loses the will to live as they head towards the (vast) bibliography" and that "the most refreshing thing about this fine book is its ideological stance." The Economist called it a 'wise manifesto.' Adam Cohen in The New York Times praised Susskind for going beyond just diagnosing the problems of technology by offering a range of promising solutions with a healthy dose of idealism.

== Bibliography ==
- The digital republic: on freedom and democracy in the 21st century Pegasus Books, New York, 2022. ISBN 9781643139012
- Future politics: living together in a world transformed by tech Oxford University Press, Oxford, United Kingdom, 2018. ISBN 9780198825616
