= John Corigliano =

American composer (born 1938)

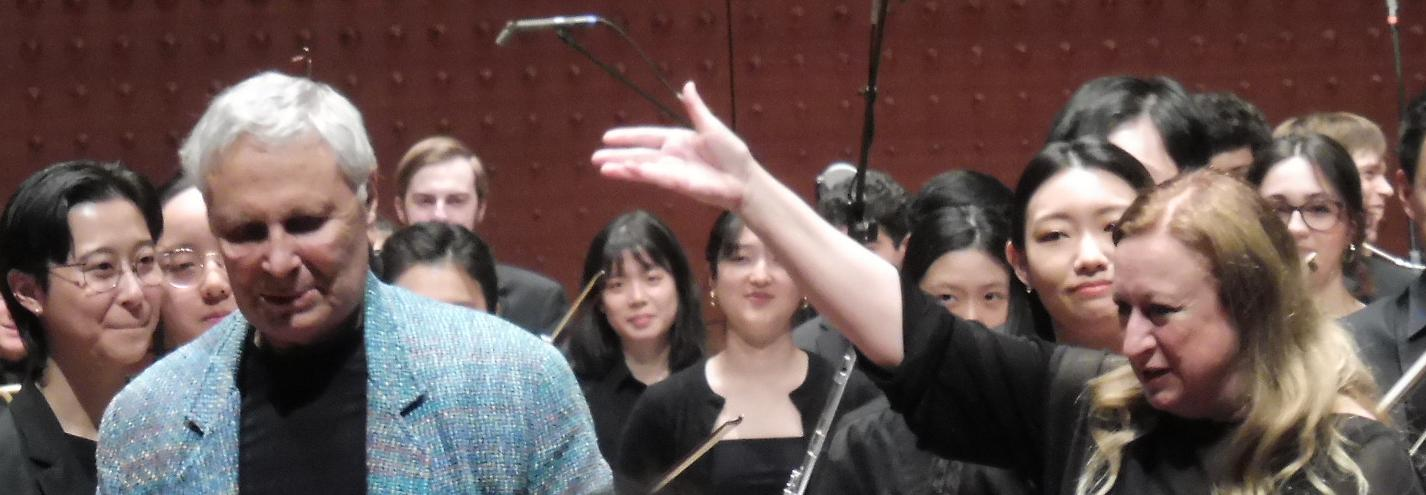
- Corigliano and Simone Young at the Juilliard School's Piano Concerto Competition Finals in April 2023, where Corigliano's Piano Concerto was played by Jack Gao
- Born: February 16, 1938 (age 88); New York City, US
- Occupation: Composer
- Works: List of compositions

John Paul Corigliano (born February 16, 1938) is an American composer of contemporary classical music. With over 100 compositions, he has won accolades including a Pulitzer Prize, five Grammy Awards, the Grawemeyer Award for Music Composition, and an Academy Award.

He is a former distinguished professor of music at Lehman College and the Graduate Center of the City University of New York and part of the composition faculty at the Juilliard School. Corigliano is best known for his Symphony No. 1, a response to the AIDS epidemic, and his film score for François Girard's The Red Violin (1997), which he adapted as his 2003 Concerto for Violin and Orchestra ("The Red Violin") for Joshua Bell.

== Biography ==
=== Before 1964 ===
Violinist John Corigliano, Sr., father of the composer.

Corigliano was born in New York City to a musical family. His Italian-American father, John Paul Corigliano Sr., was concertmaster of the New York Philharmonic for 23 years. Corigliano's mother, Rose Buzen, an educator and pianist, was Jewish.

He attended P.S. 241 and Midwood High School in Brooklyn. He studied composition at Columbia University (BA 1959) and at the Manhattan School of Music. He studied with Otto Luening, Vittorio Giannini, and Paul Creston. Before achieving success as a composer, Corigliano worked as assistant to the producer on the Leonard Bernstein Young People's Concerts and as a session producer for classical artists such as André Watts. He was also music director for New York's listener-sponsored radio station WBAI.

=== 1964–1987 ===
Corigliano first came to prominence in 1964 at age 26, when his Sonata for Violin and Piano (1963) was the only winner of the chamber-music competition of the Spoleto Festival in Italy. In 1970, Corigliano teamed up with David Hess to create The Naked Carmen. Hess has said that he and Corigliano originally conceived The Naked Carmen as a way to update the most popular opera of our time, Carmen. Mercury Records wanted the classical and popular divisions to work together and after a meeting with Joe Bott, Scott Mampe, and Bob Reno, it was decided to proceed with the project. In Hess's words, the project was "a collective decision".

After he was awarded a Guggenheim Fellowship, Corigliano began teaching at the Manhattan School of Music and became a faculty member at Lehman College. He credits his first two concerti for solo wind for both changing his art and his career. It was during the composition of his Oboe Concerto (1975) and especially his Clarinet Concerto (1977) that he first used an "architectural" method of composing.

In 1974, he wrote his first film score, for the documentary A Williamsburg Sampler. He wrote the score for Altered States (1980), for which he was nominated for the Academy Award for Best Original Score. The award-winning score for Revolution (1985), his third film, is less known, as it was long unreleased in any recorded format; it existed only in a bootlegs until Varèse Sarabande released the score for a limited time in 2009 through its CD club, and then as a regular release in 2010. Corigliano used parts of the score in his first symphony.

Corigliano composed for flutist James Galway his third wind concerto, Pied Piper Fantasy, which premiered with the Los Angeles Philharmonic (1982). In 1984, he became distinguished professor of music at Lehman College and left his position at Manhattan School of Music in 1986.

=== 1987–present ===
In 1987, Corigliano was the first composer to serve as composer-in-residence for the Chicago Symphony Orchestra. During his residency, he composed his first symphony, which was inspired by the AIDS epidemic and to honor the friends he lost. The piece won the University of Louisville Grawemeyer Award for Music Composition in 1991 and a Grammy Award for Best Classical Contemporary Composition in 1992.

Corigliano's first opera, The Ghosts of Versailles, was the Metropolitan Opera's first commission in nearly three decades, celebrating the company's 100th anniversary. The premiere was a success and the piece received the International Classical Music Awards Composition of the Year award in 1992. In 1991, Corigliano became a faculty member at the Juilliard School. In 1995, Lincoln Center commissioned him to write a string quartet for the Cleveland Quartet, which won a Grammy Award for Best Contemporary Classical Composition. Corigliano's fourth film score was for François Girard's The Red Violin (1997); he received his second nomination for and won the 1999 Oscar for Best Original Score. Parts of the score were used in his violin concerto (2003), written for Joshua Bell, who premiered it with the Baltimore Symphony Orchestra. In 2001, Corigliano received the Pulitzer Prize for his Symphony No. 2 (2001).

In 2011, Corigliano's song cycle One Sweet Morning premiered at Avery Fisher Hall by mezzo-soprano Stephanie Blythe and the New York Philharmonic, to commemorate the 10th anniversary of the September 11 attacks. Other important commissions have been Chiaroscuro (1997) for two pianos tuned a quarter tone apart for The Dranoff International Two Piano Foundation, Vocalise (1999) for the New York Philharmonic, Mr. Tambourine Man: Seven Poems of Bob Dylan (2003) which earned him his third Grammy Award, Symphony No. 3 Circus Maximus (2004) for the University of Texas Wind Ensemble, STOMP (2011) written for the 2011 Tchaikovsky Competition, and Conjurer (2008) commissioned by an international consortium of six orchestras for percussionist Evelyn Glennie and winning him his fifth Grammy Award.

Among Corigliano's students are David Sampson, Eric Whitacre, Elliot Goldenthal, Edward Knight, Nico Muhly, Roger Bergs, Michael Gilbertson, Gary Kulesha, Scott Glasgow, John Mackey, Avner Dorman, Mason Bates, Steven Bryant, Jefferson Friedman, Dinuk Wijeratne, and David Ludwig. In 1996, The Corigliano Quartet was founded, taking his name in tribute.

In 2022, eight female former Juilliard students alleged that Corigliano had taught very few female students during his tenure there, claiming that he had an "unofficial policy" of refusing to teach women. Corigliano responded that in the past year, his studio included two female students out of six total, and he added:

"It saddens me to read that you have been told by eight female students, formerly at The Juilliard School, that there was an unwritten policy by which they perceived that I favored the men over the women. Such a position was neither my preference nor my policy. I have taken great joy in working with many very gifted young women and men in my long teaching career."

== Music ==
Most of Corigliano's work has been for symphony orchestra. He employs a wide variety of styles, sometimes even within the same work, but aims to make his work accessible to a large audience. Many of his works have been performed and recorded by some of the most prominent orchestras, soloists, and chamber musicians in the world. He has written symphonies, as well as works for string orchestra, wind band, concerti, chamber and solo pieces, opera, as well as for film.

Corigliano's most distinguished works include his Clarinet Concerto (1977), Symphony No. 1 (1988), The Ghosts of Versailles (1991), Symphony No. 2 for string orchestra (2000), Mr. Tambourine Man: Seven Poems of Bob Dylan (2000), and his score for The Red Violin (1998). His clarinet concerto is the first by an American composer to have entered the standard repertoire since Aaron Copland's clarinet concerto.

== Awards ==
- 1968 – Guggenheim Fellowship for Music Composition
- 1991 – University of Louisville Grawemeyer Award for Symphony No. 1
- 1991 – Grammy Award for Best Classical Contemporary Composition for Symphony No. 1
- 1992 – GLAAD Media Award for Outstanding Composition for Symphony No 1
- 1997 – Grammy Award for Best Classical Contemporary Composition for String Quartet
- 1999 – Academy Award for Original Music Score for The Red Violin
- 2001 – Pulitzer Prize for Music for Symphony No. 2
- 2009 – Grammy Award for Best Classical Contemporary Composition for Mr. Tambourine Man: Seven Poems of Bob Dylan
- 2009 – Grammy Award for Best Classical Vocal Performance for Mr. Tambourine Man: Seven Poems of Bob Dylan
- 2014 – Grammy Award for Best Classical Instrumental Solo for Conjurer: Concerto For Percussionist & String Orchestra
- 2026 – Michael Ludwig Nemmers Prize in Music Composition

== Personal life ==
Corigliano has lived in New York City all his life. He divides his time between homes in Manhattan and Kent Cliffs (in the Hudson Valley) with his husband, the composer-librettist Mark Adamo. They were married in Santa Cruz, California, by the conductor Marin Alsop during the 2008 Cabrillo Festival of Contemporary Music.
