= Beeban Kidron =

British film director and politician (born 1961)

The Right Honourable The Baroness Kidron OBE
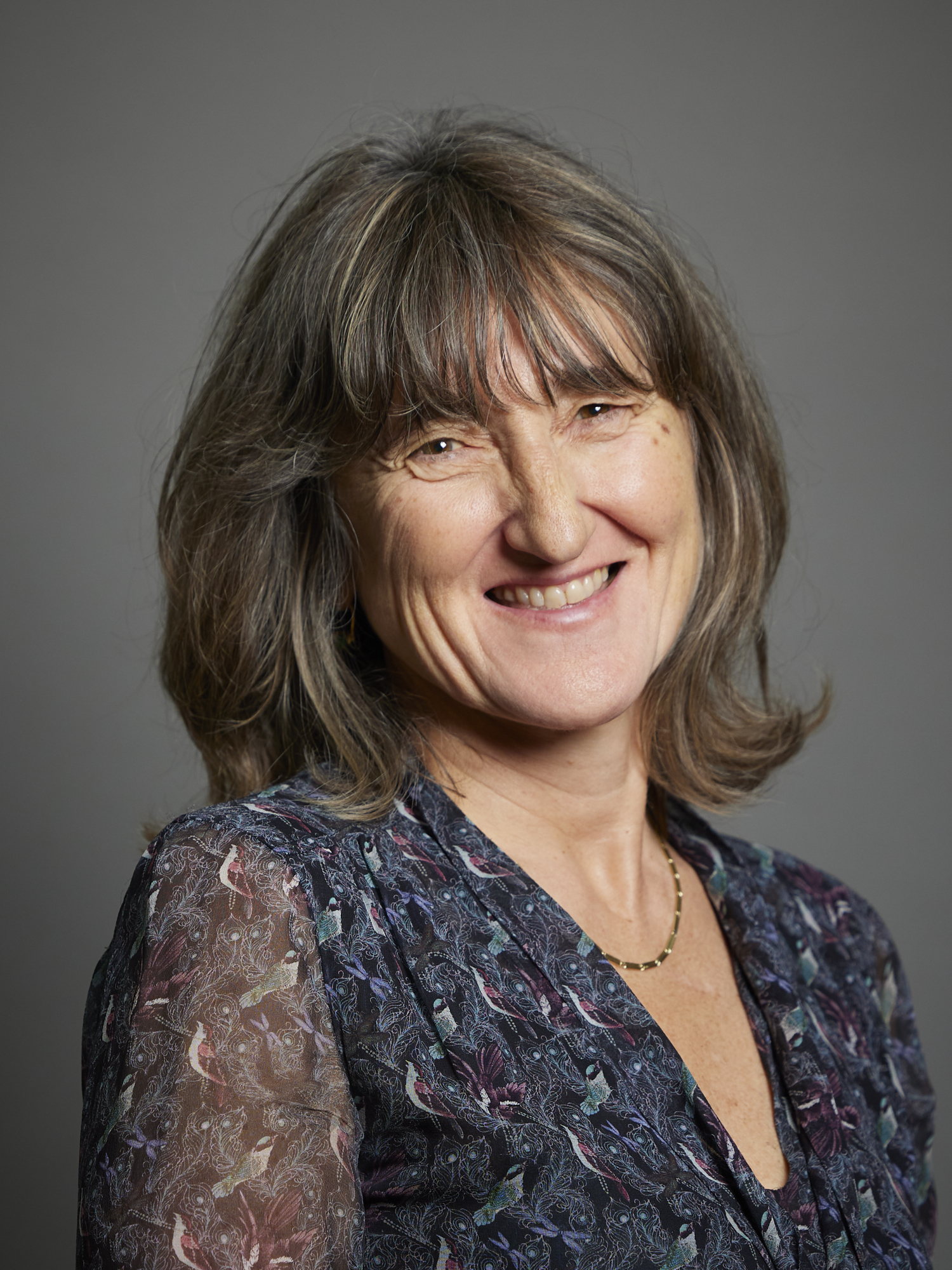
- Official portrait, 2024

Member of the House of Lords
- Lord Temporal
- Life peerage 26 June 2012

Personal details
- Born: Beeban Tania Kidron; 2 May 1961 (age 65) North London, England
- Spouse: Lee Hall (m. 2003)
- Children: 2
- Parent: Michael Kidron (father)
- Relatives: Adam Kidron (brother), Tony Cliff (uncle), Chanie Rosenberg (aunt), Donny Gluckstein (cousin)
- Education: National Film School
- Occupation: Film director, producer, campaigner

Beeban Tania Kidron, Baroness Kidron, OBE (born 2 May 1961), is a British filmmaker, politician and social activist. She is an advocate for children's rights in the digital world and has played a role in establishing standards for online safety and privacy across the world.

Baroness Kidron sits as a crossbench peer in the United Kingdom's House of Lords. She is an advisor to the Institute for Ethics in AI at Oxford University, a commissioner on the Broadband Commission for Sustainable Development, and founder of 5Rights Foundation. In June 2025, she took on the role of Honorary President at 5Rights as Sir Peter Wanless stepped into the role of chair.

Before being appointed to the Lords, she was a film director and producer, and founder of the charity Filmclub (now Into Film).

== Early life and education ==
Kidron was born in north London, to Nina Kidron and Michael Kidron. Her parents were the founders and proprietors of the independent publishing house Pluto Press, which started life from the laundry room of their family home. Michael's family were South African Jews who immigrated to Israel. Michael left Israel to attend Oxford University. He went on to teach economics, and the family spent several years living in Yorkshire while he taught at the University of Hull. Beeban attended Camden School for Girls in Sandall Road, Camden. She first took up photography when she was given a camera by landscape photographer Fay Godwin during a period when she was unable to speak following a throat operation. Her photographs were spotted by photographer Eve Arnold, whom she worked for at the age of 16 for two years. Aged 20, Kidron enrolled at the National Film School as a camerawoman. At the end of her three years of film school, Kidron switched to directing and stayed on for another year.

== Film career ==
Kidron began making documentaries in the 1980s. In 1983, she made her first documentary, Carry Greenham Home, with co-director Amanda Richardson. It was filmed during the year that they spent at the Greenham Common Women's Peace Camp during the anti nuclear protests. The film was shown at the Berlin Film Festival and, to celebrate Greenham's 25th anniversary, it was revived through The Guardian-backed website, www.yourgreenham.com.

In 1988, she made her first feature film, Vroom, which starred Clive Owen in his debut film. The following year, she came to greater prominence with her adaptation of Jeanette Winterson's autobiographical novel Oranges Are Not the Only Fruit. It won three Baftas, including Best Drama Series/Serial. In 2010, The Guardian named Oranges the eighth best TV series of all time.

Following the success of Oranges, Kidron continued to work for the BBC, making the TV feature film Antonia and Jane, distributed by Miramax in the US, as well as Itch, starring and co-written by Alexei Sayle for Channel 4's 4 Play anthology series. In 1992, Kidron moved to Hollywood to make Used People with Shirley MacLaine and Marcello Mastroianni. The following year, she directed Hookers, Hustlers, Pimps and Their Johns, a documentary about the New York City sex industry. She then returned to the UK to pair up with Winterson for the BBC film Great Moments in Aviation starring Vanessa Redgrave and Jonathan Pryce, which was subsequently renamed Shades of Fear by Miramax CEO Harvey Weinstein.

The 1990s and early 2000s saw Kidron move between Hollywood, New York and London, making features, TV programmes and documentaries. In 1995, she made To Wong Foo, Thanks for Everything! Julie Newmar, a drag queen road movie starring Wesley Snipes and Patrick Swayze. 1997 brought Swept from the Sea, a romantic adaptation of the Joseph Conrad story "Amy Foster", starring Rachel Weisz and Vincent Perez, which Variety called "masterfully crafted and heartfelt". Over the next few years, Kidron made a number of TV films both at home and abroad, including Cinderella, Texarkana and Murder, for which she was nominated for a second Bafta. In 2004, she directed the second installment of the Bridget Jones series, Bridget Jones: The Edge of Reason, starring Renée Zellweger, Colin Firth and Hugh Grant.

In 2007, she made a documentary about neighbour and friend, the sculptor Antony Gormley. Kidron and her husband, playwright and author of Billy Elliot, Lee Hall, began work on Hippie Hippie Shake, a film about the Oz magazine trials. The film was shot in 2009 with Sienna Miller and Cillian Murphy; however, Kidron and Hall left during post-production, citing artistic differences with the producers.

Kidron spent much of 2010 in Southern India researching and shooting a documentary on the Devadasi. Sex, Death and the Gods premiered on BBC 4 as part of the Storyville series.

In 2013, Kidron directed the documentary InRealLife, a co-production between Cross Street Films and Studio Lambert. The film explored teenagers and their relationship to the internet. It was this film that acted as a catalyst for her campaign work around children's rights in the online world.

Following a period away from feature films, Kidron produced the Stephen Frears-directed Victoria & Abdul, which was released in 2017. It was the first feature film produced by Cross Street Films, and starred Judi Dench as Queen Victoria and Ali Fazal as Abdul Karim. To Wong Foo, Thanks for Everything! Julie Newmar was re-released in 2019 and was named by The New York Times as among the top ten comedies on Netflix.

In 2025, Kidron appeared in the BBC documentary Hunting the Online Sex Predators, where she met with presenter James Blake to discuss the dangers of social media. She highlighted how users can be just two clicks away from accessing child abuse content online.

== Filmclub and Into Film ==
Kidron started Filmclub in September 2006 with Lindsey Makie. Filmclub is an educational charity which sets up after-school film clubs in schools in England and Wales. The scheme is free to all state primary and secondary schools. The organisation was founded in September 2006, and after a successful pilot in 2007 launched by then Chancellor Gordon Brown, Filmclub officially launched across the country in June 2009.

Filmclub gives children from participating schools access to thousands of films and organises school visits by professionals from within the film industry. Pupils are encouraged to watch a diverse range of films including blockbusters, classics, black and white movies and foreign language titles, and to review the films they watch on the organisation's website (www.filmclub.org). The clubs are generally run by teachers or a similar education professional, but may also be led by older pupils, often from a school's Sixth Form.

In 2013, Filmclub merged with First Light to become the film-based charity, Into Film. As well as running film clubs in schools, Into Film runs a youth film festival and youth film awards.

Kidron talks of the journey of Filmclub in her TED talk, The Shared Wonder of Film.

== Peerage and honour ==
Kidron was appointed Officer of the Order of the British Empire (OBE) in the 2012 Birthday Honours for services to drama.

On 25 June 2012, Kidron was created a life peer as Baroness Kidron, of Angel in the London Borough of Islington, and was introduced in the House of Lords the following day. She was appointed on the recommendation of the House of Lords Appointments Commission and sits as a crossbencher.

From 2019 to present, Kidron sits on the House of Lords Democracy and Digital Technologies Committee, having previously been on the Lords Communications Select Committee and contributed to the 2017 House of Lords "Growing up with the Internet" report. as well as reports; "BBC Charter Renewal: Reith Not Revolution" (2016), "A Privatised Future for Channel 4?" (2016), "Skills for Theatre: Developing the Pipeline of Talent" (2017), "UK Advertising in a Digital Age" (2018), "Regulating in a Digital World" (2019) and "Public Service Broadcasting: As Vital as Ever" (2019).

Kidron proposed an amendment to the Data (Use and Access) Bill in May 2025, which would have mandated generative AI companies to disclose the material they use to train their programs, and require obtaining permission from copyright holders before using any of their works in such a context. The amendment was successful in the House of Lords but later defeated in the Commons.

== 5Rights Foundation and youth advocacy ==
Kidron is the Founder and Honorary President of 5Rights Foundation, an organisation she established in 2013 to promote the rights of children online. At the launch she described it as a civil society initiative that aims to make the digital world a more transparent and empowering place for children and young people. 5Rights signatories include Unicef, the NSPCC and Barclays bank. Starting out as the iRights campaign, in 2018 it was formally registered as a charity formally constituted as The 5Rights Foundation.

5 Rights Foundation states that its mission is to build the digital world children and young people deserve. It develops policy, regulation and innovative approaches to digital issues on behalf of children and young people, working with an interdisciplinary network of experts. 5Rights has pioneered a range of international policies and programmes, such as; developing Child Online Protection Policy for the Government of Rwanda; contributing to the creation of a General Comment (codicil) on the digital world, to the Convention on the Rights of the Child (UNCRC); and working in partnership with IEEE Standards to create Universal Standards for Children and for Digital Services and Products.

Kidron is also a member of the UNESCO Broadband Commission for Sustainable Development, a UN commission to support the 2030 Sustainable Development Goals;^{,} a member of the Global Council for Extended Intelligence; a member of the UNICEF Artificial Intelligence and Child Rights policy guidance group; and sat on the WeProtect Child Dignity Alliance Technical Working Group.

== Age-Appropriate Design Code ==
Kidron, gaining cross-party support, introduced an amendment to The Data Protection Act 2018 that gave effect to the requirement to offer children specific data protection. That amendment became section 123 of the Act and required the Information Commissioner to introduce a code of data protection standards that would protect children by making online services "age appropriate". When a draft Age Appropriate Design Code was put forward by the Information Commissioner in January 2020, Baroness Kidron state: "Children and their parents have long been left with all of the responsibility but no control. Meanwhile, the tech sector has, against all rationale, been left with all the control but no responsibility. The Code will change this. It is the first piece of regulation anywhere in the world to explicitly prevent children's data being exploited in ways that undermine their safety and wellbeing." The Code will apply to all online services ‘likely to be accessed’ by a child, including web services and video games, and requires such services to have regard to the different needs of children at different stages of their development and the UK's obligations under the United Nations Convention on the Rights of the Child (UNCRC). In June 2020, the UK Government laid the Code before parliament making it the first piece of legislation of its kind and in doing so establishing that data protection is a powerful tool for delivering a better experience for children online. The Code came into effect in September 2021.

In September 2021, the ICO approved the first certification criteria for the Age Appropriate Design Code. As of November 2021, there are 3 approved certification criteria for UK GDPR, including those related to the Age Appropriate Design Code:

- ADISA ICT Asset Recovery Certification 8.0
- Age Check Certification Scheme (ACCS)
- Age Appropriate Design Certification Scheme (AADCS)

Several United States lawmakers supported the Age Appropriate Design Code, writing a joint letter to American video game developers and publishers urging them to follow the practices within the Code even though it does not apply to American companies.

== Other roles ==
Kidron was awarded an honorary doctorate from Kingston University in 2010 for her contribution to education. She became a board member of the UK Film Council in 2008 with a mandate to provide film education. Following the dissolution of the Film Council, she became a governor of the BFI. In March 2015, she was awarded the Grassroot Diplomat Initiative Award under the Social Driver category for her extensive work on Filmclub and the iRights Framework used to empower young people on the use of social media and the internet. This was the first award she had won for her campaigning work.

Kidron was a member of the Joint Arts Council England and Durham University Commission on Creativity and Education from 2018, is a patron of Law Action Worldwide and was previously a member of the Royal Foundation's Taskforce for the Prevention of Cyberbullying, chaired by HRH Duke of Cambridge. She is a frequent speaker and contributor on all aspects of children's digital interactions and the need for human-centred system design. From 2016 to 2019 Kidron was a visiting fellow at Lady Margaret Hall at Oxford University. Kidron was a member of the Growing Up Digital Taskforce for the Children's Commissioner's Growing Up Digital report in 2017.

== Personal life ==
Kidron is married to playwright Lee Hall. She has two children. She was the niece of Socialist Workers Party founder Tony Cliff and activist Chanie Rosenberg, and the cousin of historian Donny Gluckstein.

== Filmography ==
Title	Year	Director	Editor	Cinemat-ographer	Producer	Production Company	Notes
Victoria & Abdul	2017				Yes		
InRealLife	2013	Yes				Studio Lambert	Documentary film
Sex, Death and the Gods	2011	Yes		Yes	Yes	BBC, Cross Street Films	series documentary
Hippie Hippie Shake	2010	Yes				Universal, Working Title	Unreleased
Anthony Gormley: Making Space	2007	Yes			Yes	C4, Cross Street Films	
Bridget Jones: The Edge of Reason	2004	Yes				Universal, Working Title	
Murder	2002	Yes				BBC	TV miniseries
Cinderella	2000	Yes				C4	TV movie
Texarkana	1998	Yes				Sacret, NBC	TV movie
Swept from the Sea	1997	Yes			Yes	Sony, Tapson Steel	
Eve Arnold in Retrospect	1996	Yes			Yes	BBC, Omnibus	
To Wong Foo, Thanks for Everything! Julie Newmar	1995	Yes				Universal, Amblin	
Great Moments in Aviation	1993	Yes				BBC, Miramax	
Hookers Hustlers Pimps and Their Johns	1993	Yes				C4, Wonderland	Documentary film
Used People	1992	Yes				20th Century Fox, Largo	
4 Play	1991	Yes				C4, Chrysalis	Episode: Itch
Antonia and Jane	1991	Yes				BBC, Miramax	
Oranges Are Not the Only Fruit	1990	Yes				BBC, A&E	
Vroom	1988	Yes				Film 4	
Global Gamble	1985	Yes				Diverse, C4	
Alex	1985	Yes				NFTS	
Carry Greenham Home	1983	Yes	Yes	Yes		Contemporary Films, C4	

Thanks	Date
An Education	2009

== Awards and nominations ==
Film	Result	Award	Category
Alex	Won	Lillian Gish Award 1983	Best Writer/Director
Carry Greenham Home	Won	Chicago International Film Awards	Golden Hugo
Oranges Are Not the Only Fruit	Won	British Academy Television Awards	Best Drama Series
Oranges Are Not the Only Fruit	Won	San Francisco International Lesbian and Gay Film Festival	Best Feature
Oranges Are Not the Only Fruit	Won	GLAAD	Outstanding TV movie
Oranges Are Not the Only Fruit	Won	Cannes Film Festival	FIPA D'argent
Oranges Are Not the Only Fruit	Won	Prix Italia	Special Prize for fiction
Too Wong Foo Thanks for Everything Julie Newmar	Nominated	GLAAD	Outstanding Film
Murder	Nominated	British Academy Television Awards	Best Drama
Used People	Nominated	Golden Globes	Marcello Mastroianni and Shirley MacLaine Best Actor/Actress
Murder	Nominated	British Academy Television Awards	Best Drama Serial
Murder	Nominated	Emmy	Best TV Movie
Bridget Jones, on the Edge of Reason	Won	Evening Standard Readers	Film of 2004
Bridget Jones, on the Edge of Reason	Nominated	Peoples Choice Award	Best Comedy
Bridget Jones, on the Edge of Reason	Nominated	Peoples Choice Award	Best Sequel
Bridget Jones, on the Edge of Reason	Nominated	Empire Award	Best British Film
Hookers Hustlers Pimps and their Johns	Won	Erotic Awards	Most Erotic British TV Show
Herself	Won	WFTV UK Awards	Creative Originality Award 2010
Herself	Won	Glamour	Woman of the Year 2005

Thanks	Date
An Education	2009

== See also ==
- List of female film and television directors
- List of LGBT-related films directed by women
