= Donny Gluckstein =

British historian at Edinburgh College (born 1954)

Donny Gluckstein (born 1954) is a British historian at Edinburgh College. He is the author of numerous books and articles. In 2013, his book A People's History of the Second World War was shortlisted for the Bread and Roses Award.

== Biography ==
Gluckstein was born in 1954, the son of Tony Cliff and Chanie Rosenberg. He went to the University of Warwick in 1974 and graduated in history. His cousin is the filmmaker and crossbench peer Beeban, Baroness Kidron, through his uncle, his mother's brother, Michael Kidron.

In 1994, he published the book, Tragedy of Bukharin.

In 2013, his book A People's History of the Second World War was shortlisted for the Bread and Roses Award.

== Critical reception ==
Of his book, Tragedy of Bukharin, The Russian Review said it "can be recommended as a concise and well-written review of the debates of the 1920s from a Trotskyist perspective [but the] book cannot be viewed as a serious contribution to Bukharin scholarship. Gluckstein seems to have read Bukharin more to catch him out in theoreticalerrors than to establish the logic of his outlook".

For its part, the journal Russian History considered that Gluckstein "writes clearly and concisely, and his defense of the Left and attack on the Right is nuanced and balanced [...] The book is stimulating [...] Gluckstein's emphasis on Bukharin's early Leftism is a useful corrective to the prevailing emphasis on his later period, and his presentation of Bukharin's career [...] shows Bukharin to have been more ruthless and more blind to the consequences of his politics than is generally acknowledged".

Of the book, The Labour Party: A Marxist history (1998), Labour/Le Travail said "The purpose of this book is self-consciously doctrinal and didactic [...] Their trek through the past is designed to serve larger objectives [...] . The authors provide a number of sharp observations to leaven the polemic".

Of the book Radical Jewish Tradition with co-written with Janey Stone, The Monthly Review said the authors "have collaborated on a lucid, potentially popular treatment of a large and complex subject" and they "effectively bring together the antinomies of nineteenth-century Jewish identity in Europe and beyond" although they "stumble somewhat over the complexities and contradictions among Jewish Communists" but overall "The authors offer historical insights crucial on the role of the world Jewish left and the Zionist movement leading up to the Jewish state".

== Selected works ==
- The Western Soviets: Workers' Councils versus Parliament, 1915-20 (London: Bookmarks: 1985).
- Marxism and Trade Union Struggle: The General Strike of 1926 (co-authored with Tony Cliff) (London: Bookmarks, 1986).
- The Labour Party: A Marxist history (coauthored with Tony Cliff) (London: Bookmarks: 1988/1996).
- The Tragedy of Bukharin (London: Pluto, 1994).
- The Nazis, Capitalism and the Working Class (London: Bookmarks, 1999, and Chicago: Haymarket, 2012).
- The Paris Commune: A Revolution in Democracy (London: Bookmarks: 2006, and Chicago: Haymarket, 2011).
- A People's History of the Second World War: Resistance versus Empire (London: Pluto, 2012).
- Fighting on all fronts: Popular Resistance in the Second World War (editor) (London: Bookmarks: 2015).
- Hegel and Revolution (co-authored with Terry Sullivan) (London: Bookmarks, 2020).
- Gluckstein, Donny; Stone, Janey (2026). The Radical Jewish Tradition: Revolutionaries, Resistance Fighters and Firebrands. New York: Verso. ISBN 978-1836741756.
