= Filmclub =

British education charity

Filmclub was an education charity that sets up film clubs in schools and other education and care establishments in England, Wales, Northern Ireland, Scotland, and the Isle of Man. The scheme is free to all state primary and secondary schools in Wales and England. In 2013, Filmclub merged with First Light to become the film-based charity Into Film.

== Organisation ==
The organisation was founded in September 2006. Led by Chief Executive Mark Higham, a pilot in 2007 was followed by a UK roll-out in April 2008, The charity merged with partner First Light in 2013 to create Into Film. Filmclub children from participating schools access to thousands of films through the purchase of a license. Pupils are encouraged to watch a diverse range of films including classics, black and white movies, documentaries, blockbusters and foreign language titles, and to review the films they watch on the organisation's website. The clubs are generally run by teachers or similar education professionals, but may also be led by older pupils, often from a school's Sixth Form. Filmclub also organises school visits by professionals from within the film industry. In England Filmclub is funded by The BFI Lottery Fund. In Wales, Filmclub is funded via the Film Agency Wales, by the Welsh Assembly. Filmclub is funded in Northern Ireland by the Department of Culture, Arts and Leisure (DCAL) through Northern Ireland Screen and delivered by CineMagic and the Nerve Centre. Filmclub receives philanthropic support from LOVEFiLM.

Filmclub Patrons have included actor Emma Thompson and director Mike Leigh. Filmclub Ambassador for Wales is actor Michael Sheen, Ambassador for Scotland is director Kevin MacDonald and Ambassador for Northern Ireland is film maker Mark Cousins

== Founders ==
- Beeban Kidron began directing films in the late 1980s and after studying at the National Film and Television School, went on to win a BAFTA for the television movie Oranges Are Not the Only Fruit. She has since directed seven feature films including Thanks for Everything, Julie Newmar (1995) and Bridget Jones: The Edge of Reason (2004). She was awarded an OBE in the Queen's Birthday Honours list of 2012 and introduced to the House of Lords as a cross-party peer in the same year.
- Lindsay Mackie is Chair of the Readers and Writers Committee and founder of the national book club programme Reading For Pleasure which has been established in secondary schools. Mackie has also been a journalist for The Guardian, specialising in race and home affairs, a film critic with The Herald and arts feature writer with The Scotsman.

== Clubs and activities ==
There are currently around 7,000 clubs running in England, Northern Ireland, Wales, the Isle of Man and Scotland, with approximately 220,000 young people meeting every week to watch films from around the world. Clubs are run by education professionals, parents and sixth formers.

Each week, ten members are awarded "reviewer of the week' status for the film reviews they have submitted to the website (about 6,000 reviews are uploaded each week onto the website).

Filmclub's 'Young Ambassadors' scheme, where members interviewed film talent at press events and premieres has been replaced by a Talent Development program which enables students to learn more about the industry by attending film events and screenings and taking part in other film industry interactions. The scheme, which includes training workshops and work experiences has three strands – Reporters, Reviewers and Programmers.

All members have the opportunity to interact with film industry professionals through Filmclub's "Close Encounters" activity.

== Close Encounters ==
Filmclub's "Close Encounters" scheme (named after the 1977 science fiction film Close Encounters of the Third Kind) brings pupils into contact with professionals from film, and related industries such as film journalism. Directors, actors, producers, screenwriters, casting directors and costume/set designers have participated in events which typically involve question and answer sessions and workshops. Industry professionals visit schools across the UK to take part in these interview sessions. In addition for five days at the end of each month, Filmclub runs a week of daily live streamed webcasts in which all members can participate by posting questions on Twitter, via email or on the phone. The Close Encounters scheme has also arranged for pupils to visit working film sets.

== Trustees ==
=== Lord Bichard ===
Throughout his career of over 30 years, Lord Michael Bichard has worked in local and central Government. He was Permanent Secretary of the Department for Employment when it merged with the Department for Education and Skills (United Kingdom) to form the Department for Education and Employment. He served as Permanent Secretary for the new combined department from 1995-2001 and was then appointed to be Rector of the University of the Arts London (formerly The London Institute). He currently holds the post of Director of Institute for Government and serves as Filmclub Chair.

=== Baroness Kidron ===
A co-founder and deputy chair of Filmclub, Beeban Kidron's directorial work has attracted many awards including The Prix Italia, BAFTAs, a Golden Hugo, Critics choice at Crietiel, The Lillian Gish award and RTS awards. Her work includes Bridget Jones: The Edge of Reason, Cinderella, Thanks for Everything Julie Newmar, Love at First Sight and Oranges are Not the Only Fruit.

=== Lindsay Mackie ===
Lindsay Mackie is a former journalist and is heavily involved in literacy programmes for UK schools. Sh.

=== Michael Harris ===
Proprietor of his own management recruitment company for twenty-five years, Harris is now the non-executive director of several media companies. He is also the treasurer at Filmclub, BAFTA and Comic Relief.

=== Eric Fellner ===
Eric Fellner is co-chairman of Britain's largest independent production company, Working Title Films.

=== Alan Parker ===
Alan Parker is founder and chairman of Brunswick Group LLP.

=== Janice Middleton ===
Janice Middleton taught in schools in mining communities in Yorkshire before becoming headteacher at Victoria Primary School in Edlington, near Doncaster in 1989. Middleton is leader of her school's film club and is part of Filmclub's Star incentive and reward scheme for outstanding club leaders. She became a Filmclub Board member in June 2010.

=== Samira Ahmed ===
Samira Ahmed has been a news anchor and correspondent on both sides of the Atlantic.

=== Matthew Slotover ===
Matthew Slotover is the co-publisher of Frieze magazine and co-director of the London art fair of the same name in Regent's Park. He is chair of the South London Gallery board of trustees and has acted as a judge for the Turner Prize.

=== Sir Alasdair Macdonald ===
Sir Alasdair is Headteacher of Morpeth School, and in 2008 received a knighthood for services to both local and national education.

== Partners ==
Filmclub works with the following organisations:

- British Film Institute
- LOVEFiLM
- BAFTA
- Film Agency Wales
- Welsh Assembly
- Northern Ireland Screen
- Nerve Centre
- CineMagic
- Times Educational Supplement
- First Light, a charity that aims to helps young people from all backgrounds to develop their skills and entrepreneurial capabilities, and to provide opportunities for work with industry professionals on youth-led media projects. Filmclub's club of the year is presented at First Light's annual awards event.
- Creative Skillset
- The Industry Trust for Intellectual Property Awareness
- Parent-Teacher Associations UK (PTA-UK, formerly NCPTA), a national charity and membership organisation supporting 75% of all PTAs in England, Wales and Northern Ireland.

== See also ==
- List of film critics
- List of film festivals
