= Richard Redmayne =

British engineer (1865–1955)

Sir Richard Redmayne KCB MICE MIMM FGS
- Redmayne in 1918/19
- Born: Richard Augustine Studdert Redmayne; 22 July 1865; Low Fell, Gateshead, County Durham, England
- Died: 27 December 1955 (aged 90); Little Hadham, Hertfordshire, England
- Education: Durham College of Science
- Occupations: Engineer and academic
- Spouse: Edith Rose Richards (m. 1898)
- Children: 3
- Relatives: Eddie Redmayne and James Redmayne (great grandsons)
- Engineering career
- Discipline: Civil engineer Mining engineer
- Employers: Home Office; University of Birmingham

Sir Richard Augustine Studdert Redmayne KCB MICE MIMM FGS (22 July 1865 – 27 December 1955) was a British academic, civil engineer, and mining engineer. Redmayne worked as manager of several mines in Britain and South Africa before becoming a professor at the University of Birmingham. He was a leading figure in improving mine safety in the early twentieth century and would become the first Chief Inspector of Mines, leading investigations into many of the mine disasters of his time. He became the president of three professional associations, namely the Institution of Mining and Metallurgy, the Institution of Professional Civil Servants and the Institution of Civil Engineers.

Redmayne was the author of several books documenting coal mining practice in the twentieth century, one of which was acknowledged as a standard reference text for other engineers. His work in mine safety and increasing mine output during the First World War was acknowledged with an appointment as Knight Commander of the Order of the Bath, Knight of the French Legion of Honour and a Companion of the Order of Saint John. Throughout his life, he was a dedicated civil servant and served on many of the inter-war committees for the Imperial Mineral Resources Bureau and the Ministry of Transport.

== Early life ==
Redmayne was born in Low Fell, Gateshead, England. He received an education at Durham College of Science in Newcastle upon Tyne before being apprenticed to William Armstrong, a mining engineer, at Hetton Colliery in Pittington. He was elected a student member of the North of England Institute of Mining and Mechanical Engineers on 13 December 1884 and obtained a First Class Certificate of Competency as a Manager of Mines on 28 October 1887.

== Career ==
=== Mining engineer ===
Redmayne became an under-manager at Hetton Colliery before transferring to South Africa in 1891, where he became the manager of Walmsley Collieries near Newcastle, Colony of Natal. Whilst in South Africa, he became a member of the Federated Institution of Mining Engineers. Returning to Britain in 1894, he became the manager of a colliery at Seaton Delaval in Northumberland.

=== Academia ===
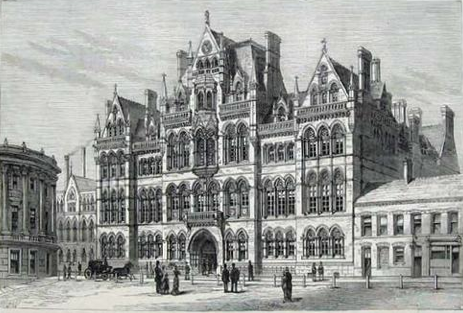
Birmingham University as it was when Redmayne was Professor

In 1902, Redmayne was given the chair in mining engineering at the newly founded University of Birmingham. Whilst there Redmayne sought to promote universities as a means of training engineers over the more traditional apprenticeship system. Under his direction, the university became the first in the country to house an ore dressing laboratory and a model underground coal mine.

=== Government work ===
During his professorship, Redmayne sat on several committees and inquiries investigating safety procedures and working practice in coal mines. These included the committee which recommended an eight-hour day for coal workers implemented as the Eight Hour Act in 1906 and the Royal Commission into accident prevention in 1908 which also resulted in tighter safety regulations.

From 1908 to 1913 Redmayne was appointed a commissioner to inquire into mine disasters at the Hamstead, Maypole, South Moor, Whitehaven, Little Hulton, Cadeby and Senghenydd. The disasters he investigated caused a loss of 1250 lives in total. In recognition of his work improving mine safety Redmayne was invested as a Companion and a Knight Commander of the Order of the Bath in the 1912 Birthday Honours and the 1914 Birthday Honours respectively.

Redmayne resigned from the university in 1908 to take up a job at the Home Office as the first Chief Inspector of Mines. Perhaps his most significant achievement in this role was his work with Sir Malcolm Delevingne in bringing about the Coal Mines Act 1911 (1 & 2 Geo. 5. c. 50) which significantly increased the safety of mines. During the first part of the First World War, Redmayne served as head of the Production Department of the Control of Coal Mines. From 1917 to 1919 he was the chief technical advisor to the Controller of Coal Mines and in 1919 acted as an assessor to Sir John Sankey who was the chairman of the Royal Commission on Coalmines. From 1918 he was also the chairman of the Imperial Mineral Resources Bureau, resigning as chief inspector in 1919 to dedicate more time to the bureau and to set up a private engineering consultancy. He chaired the bureau's examination and entry board from 1912 until 1950.

Redmayne also led an enquiry into an experiment by the chain Boots to reduce the working week, allowing workers to have a 48-hour weekend, which found that the workers were happier, had better health, and were less likely to be absent, and advocated for its adoption across wider industry.

Redmayne continued to sit on government committees well into his old age and was the independent chairman of the National Conciliation Board on Road Motor Haulage from 1934 until 1938 and as chairman of the Road Haulage Wages Board from 1938 until 1941.

== Professional affiliations ==
Redmayne was an active member of many institutions throughout his life, starting with his election as a student member of the North of England Institute of Mining and Mechanical Engineers in 1884. He became a member of the Federated Institution of Mining Engineers in 1889 and would be elected an honorary member in 1909. He was elected to the presidency of the Institution of Mining and Metallurgy in 1916, the first of several such offices. In 1922, during his tenure as chairman of the Imperial Resources Bureau, he became the first president of the Institution of Professional Civil Servants, an office to which he was re-elected every year until his death. He served as president of the Institution of Civil Engineers for the 1934-5 session and was a fellow of the Geological Society. He was also made a Knight of the National Order of the Legion of Honour and a Companion of the Order of Saint John.

== Publications ==
Redmayne was the author of several publications during his lifetime. The first of these was his co-authorship of Colliery Working and Management with Harrison Bulman, which was acknowledged as a standard text and was reprinted several times. His five-volume Modern Practice in Mining is a comprehensive account of the coal mining industry of his time and was written from 1908 to 1932. His autobiography Men, Mines and Memories was written in 1942 and his account of the war, The British Coal Mining Industry During the War was written in 1923.

== Personal life ==
In 1898, Redmayne married Edith Rose Richards, with whom he would father one son, John, Esq., and two daughters.

He died, aged ninety, at his home in Little Hadham, Hertfordshire on 27 December 1955. His great-grandsons through John's son, Richard, Esq., include the cricketer James Redmayne and the actor Eddie Redmayne.

Professional and academic associations
Preceded by Henry Maybury	President of the Institution of Civil Engineers; November 1934 – November 1935	Succeeded by John Duncan Watson
Trade union offices
Preceded by New position	Honorary President of the Institution of Professional Civil Servants; 1921–1955	Succeeded by Graham Sutton
