= Eddie Redmayne =

English actor (born 1982)

Eddie Redmayne OBE
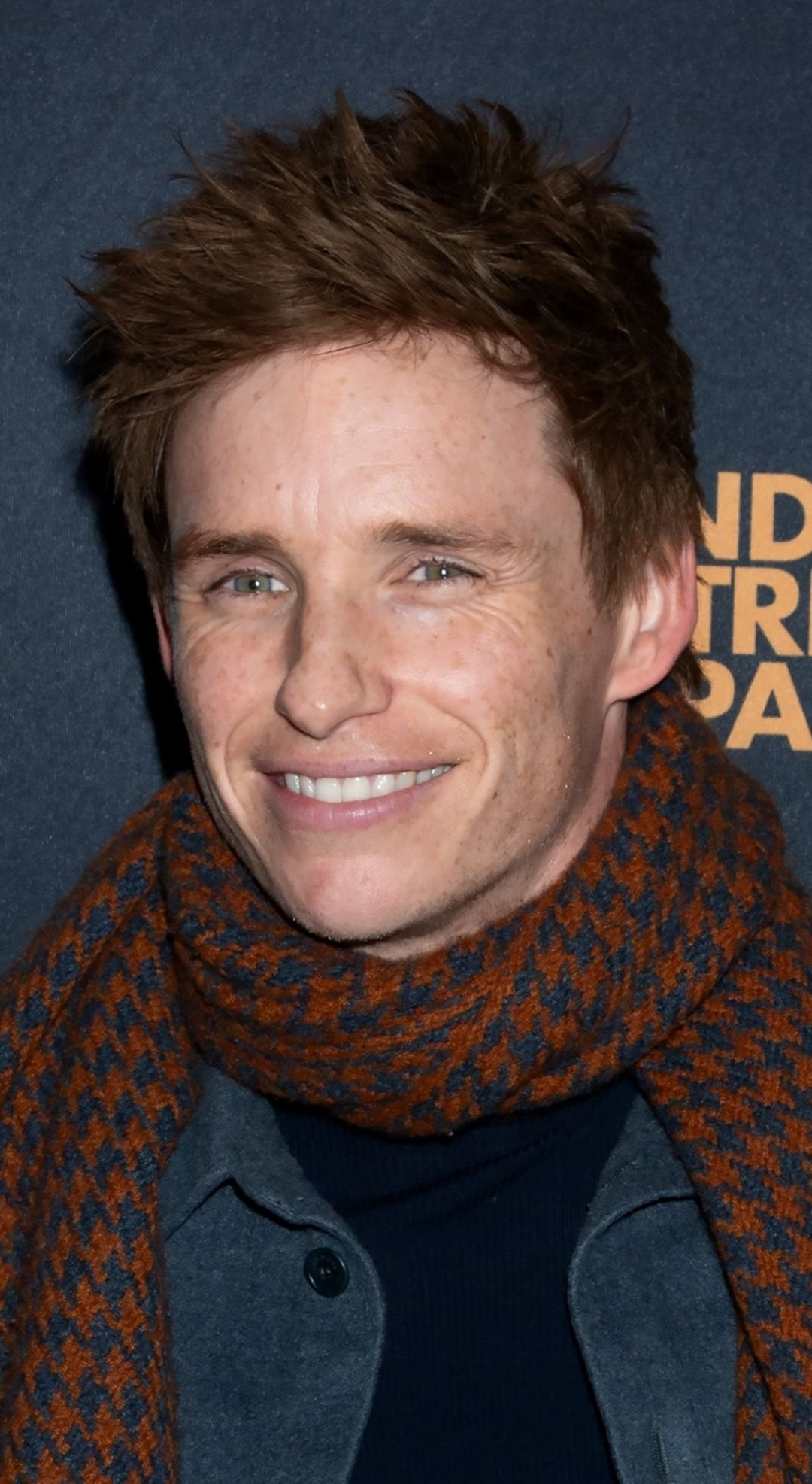
- Redmayne in 2024
- Born: Edward John David Redmayne; 6 January 1982 (age 44); Westminster, London, England
- Education: Trinity College, Cambridge
- Occupation: Actor
- Years active: 1998–present
- Spouse: Hannah Bagshawe (m. 2014)
- Children: 2
- Relatives: James Redmayne (brother); Richard Redmayne (great-grandfather)
- Awards: Full list

Edward John David Redmayne (/ˈrɛdmeɪn/; born 6 January 1982) is an English actor. His accolades include an Academy Award, a Tony Award, a British Academy Film Award, a Golden Globe Award, and two Olivier Awards.

Redmayne began his professional acting career on television and in theatre. He starred as Viola in Twelfth Night at Shakespeare's Globe, before transitioning to the West End with starring roles in productions such as The Goat, or Who Is Sylvia? (2004), Red (2009–2010), and Richard II (2011–2012); He received the Laurence Olivier Award for Best Actor in a Supporting Role and later the Tony Award for Best Featured Actor in a Play for his performances in the West End and Broadway productions of Red. For his performances as The Emcee in the West End and Broadway revivals of Cabaret (2021–2022; 2024), he won the Laurence Olivier Award for Best Actor in a Musical and earned a nomination for the Tony Award for Best Actor in a Musical.

Redmayne achieved wider recognition for his portrayal of physicist Stephen Hawking in The Theory of Everything (2014), which won him the Academy Award for Best Actor. He received a second Academy Award nomination for his portrayal of Lili Elbe in The Danish Girl (2015) and subsequently starred as Newt Scamander in the Fantastic Beasts film series (2016–2022). His other film credits include My Week with Marilyn (2011), Les Misérables (2012), Jupiter Ascending (2015), Early Man (2018), The Trial of the Chicago 7 (2020), and The Good Nurse (2022). On television, he starred in the miniseries The Pillars of the Earth (2010) and Birdsong (2012), and has portrayed the Jackal in the spy thriller The Day of the Jackal (2024–present).

== Early life and education ==
Edward John David Redmayne was born on 6 January 1982 in Westminster, London. His mother, Patricia (née Burke), runs a relocation business, and his father, Richard Redmayne, is a businessman in corporate finance. His paternal great-grandfather was Sir Richard Redmayne (1865–1955), a civil and mining engineer, and a leading figure in improving mine safety in the early twentieth century. Sir Richard also led an enquiry into an experiment by the chain Boots to reduce the working week, allowing workers to have a 48-hour weekend, which found that the workers were happier, had better health, and were less likely to be absent, and advocated its adoption across wider industry.

He has an elder brother, cricketer James Redmayne; a younger brother; an elder half-brother, Charlie Redmayne, who is the former CEO of the UK division of publisher HarperCollins; and a half-sister.

From the age of 10, Redmayne attended Jackie Palmer Stage School, where he found his love for acting and singing. After a spell at Eaton House, he won a music scholarship to Colet Court (now St Paul's Prep School), where he sang with the St Paul's Choir. He then won a music scholarship to Eton College, where he was in the same year as Prince William.

He received a choral scholarship to attend the University of Cambridge, where he read History of Art at Trinity College, specialising in Venetian architecture and surrealism, and graduated with 2:1 Honours in 2003. He wrote his theses on Brâncuși and Yves Klein; although colour blind, he wrote the final thesis on International Klein Blue (IKB), which he has described as being highly emotional, and which he can always distinguish from others. While at Cambridge, Redmayne was a member of the University Pitt Club.

== Acting career ==
=== Stage ===
Redmayne made his professional stage debut as Viola in Twelfth Night, for Shakespeare's Globe at the Middle Temple Hall in 2002. He won the award for Outstanding Newcomer at the 50th Evening Standard Theatre Awards in 2004, for his performance in Edward Albee's The Goat, or Who Is Sylvia?, and the award for Best Newcomer at the Critics' Circle Theatre Awards in 2005. Reviewing a revival of the play in 2017, critic Heather Neill described the "gut-wrenching intensity of Eddie Redmayne's award-winning performance at the Almeida in 2004".

Redmayne starred in Now or Later by Christopher Shinn at the Royal Court Theatre. The show ran from 3 September to 1 November 2008. His performance received glowing reviews, with critic and playwright Nicholas de Jongh describing the performance as "riveting, suffused with the lineaments of neurosis and sadness".

In 2009, Redmayne appeared in John Logan's new play Red at the Donmar Warehouse in London, for which he won the 2010 Olivier Award for Best Actor in a Supporting Role. Reviewing the show during this London run, longstanding New York Times critic Ben Brantley described Redmayne as "a star in the making". He reprised his role in Red at the John Golden Theatre on Broadway, in a 15-week run from 11 March to 27 June 2010, and won the 2010 Tony Award for Best Performance by a Featured Actor in a Play.

He portrayed King Richard II in Richard II directed by Michael Grandage, at the Donmar Warehouse from 6 December 2011 to 4 February 2012. He received the Trewin Award for Best Shakespearean Performance at the Critics Circle Theatre Awards. Matt Wolf, London theatre critic for The New York Times International Edition, described Redmayne as "tearing into the title role with an open-faced splendor that redefines the very discussion of soul that assumes such prominence in Shakespeare's luxuriantly beautiful text"

In November 2021, he returned to the stage as Emcee in a West End revival of Cabaret at the Playhouse Theatre, remodelled as the 'Kit Kat Club'. He previously played the role in a production at Eton when he was 17 years-old, and then again in a production at the Edinburgh Fringe. Redmayne successfully approached Jessie Buckley to star alongside him as Sally Bowles, as well as Rebecca Frecknall about directing the production. The revival drew rave reviews, with critic John Lahr stating that the 'scintillating show' also offered the 'rousing spectacle of the next generation's theatrical talent on the ascendant.' Lahr described Redmayne's interpretation of the Emcee as "thrilling", "a puckish portrait of violent innocence, a cross between Peter Lorre and Peter Pan", with a "chilling metamorphosis". John Nathan remarked, "Redmayne is a marvel. His Emcee — a slightly different species from the rest of the humans — is quite the most mercurial animal I have seen on stage". The revival led with seven wins at the 2022 Olivier Awards, including Best Musical Revival and Redmayne's own for Best Actor in a Musical, setting a record for being the most award-winning revival in Olivier history, as well for being the first production to obtain awards in all four eligible acting categories. In April 2024, the production transferred to the August Wilson Theatre on Broadway, where he reprised the role of the Emcee opposite Gayle Rankin as Sally Bowles. For his performance, Redmayne received a nomination for the Tony Award for Best Actor in a Musical at the 77th Tony Awards.

=== Screen ===
Redmayne made his screen debut in 1998 in an episode of Animal Ark. His television credits include the BBC miniseries Tess of the d'Urbervilles, the miniseries The Pillars of the Earth, and the two-part miniseries Birdsong. David Chater, who served as a correspondent in many conflict-ridden areas, described his performance as a WWI soldier in Birdsong as "mesmerising", "astonishing", "so little is visible on the surface and yet a whole universe of emotions is simmering away behind those limpid eyes."

Redmayne was cast in his first feature film Like Minds (2006) after being spotted by casting director Lucy Bevan performing in a play called Goats. Redmayne has appeared in films such as The Good Shepherd (2006), Savage Grace (2007), Powder Blue (2008), The Other Boleyn Girl (2008), Glorious 39 (2009), and Hick (2011). He starred as Osmund in Christopher Smith's supernatural gothic chiller film Black Death (2010). His 2008 Sundance drama film The Yellow Handkerchief was released on 26 February 2010 by Samuel Goldwyn Films.

In 2011, Redmayne starred as filmmaker Colin Clark in the drama film My Week with Marilyn. He took on the role of Marius Pontmercy for the 2012 musical film Les Misérables.

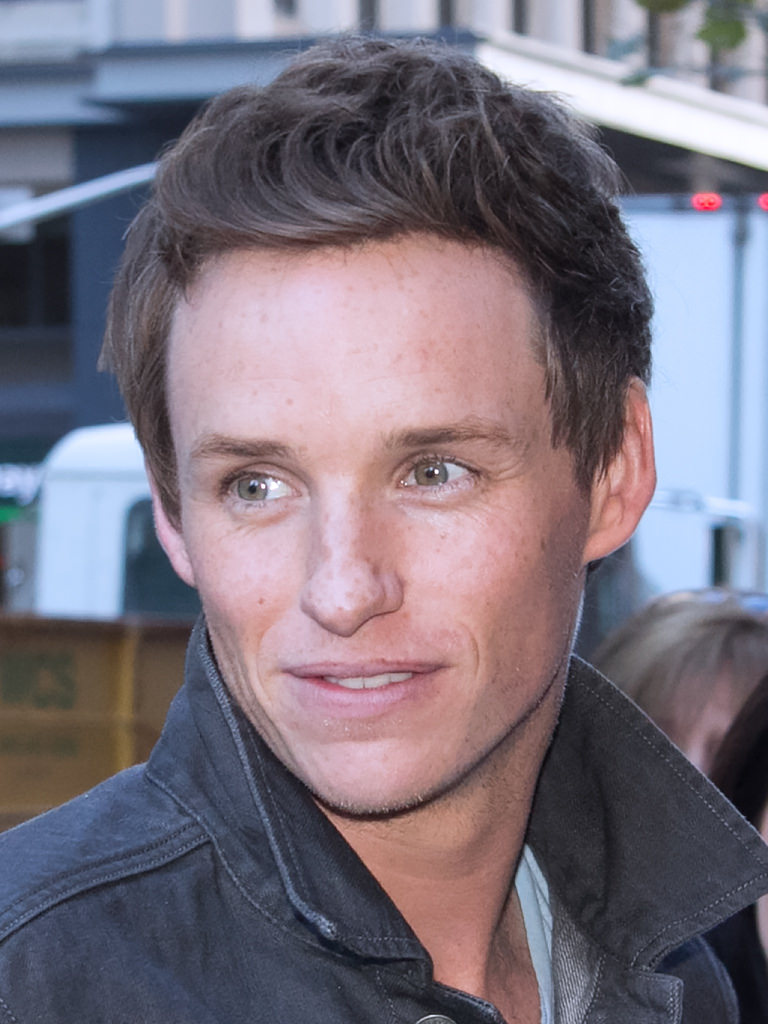
Redmayne at the 2014 Toronto International Film Festival

In 2014, Redmayne starred as Stephen Hawking in The Theory of Everything, a role for which he won the Academy Award, BAFTA, Golden Globe, and Screen Actors Guild Award for Best Actor, depicting the debilitating challenges of ALS. Hawking was very pleased by the portrayal, stating "I thought Eddie Redmayne portrayed me very well. At times I thought he was me. I think Eddie's commitment will have a big emotional impact." Dr Katie Sidle, a consultant neurologist specialising in the field of motor neurone disease (MND), stated in an interview in the British Medical Journal, "Eddie's performance in the film was utterly remarkable . . . The patients and carers loved the film. They thought it was very relevant to them."

In early 2015, Redmayne appeared in the Wachowski's film, Jupiter Ascending as Balem Abrasax. The film was widely panned, including his performance, and won him the Golden Raspberry Award for Worst Supporting Actor. In recent years, the film and the performance have been re-evaluated, with Keith Phipps writing that the "film has shown every sign of turning into a full-fledged cult hit." Writing in Vanity Fair in 2018, Laura Bradley remarked that "the idea that this film would have been improved by Redmayne playing his part in a more conventional (read: boring) manner is absurd." In 2022, Joe Hoeffner echoing her thoughts, felt that with a more "normal villain", "the rest of the film would be flatter, less colorful, less deliriously camp...no matter what happens you can't take your eyes off of the spacefaring Oedipus with the voice of a chainsmoker."

Redmayne also presented the 2015 documentary War Art with Eddie Redmayne, made as part of the ITV's Perspectives programme. In 2015, Redmayne guest starred as Ryan the Tank Engine in the 2015 film, Thomas & Friends: Sodor's Legend of the Lost Treasure.

That same year, Redmayne starred in the biographical drama The Danish Girl, directed by Academy Award-winning director Tom Hooper. In the film, released in the United Kingdom on 1 January 2016, Redmayne portrayed transgender pioneer Lili Elbe, a casting choice that was met with backlash from the transgender community. Nonetheless, Redmayne's performance garnered critical acclaim; in January 2016, he earned his second nomination for the Academy Award for Best Actor in consecutive years. Redmayne later acknowledged the controversy surrounding his casting by stressing the importance of casting transgender people to play transgender characters.

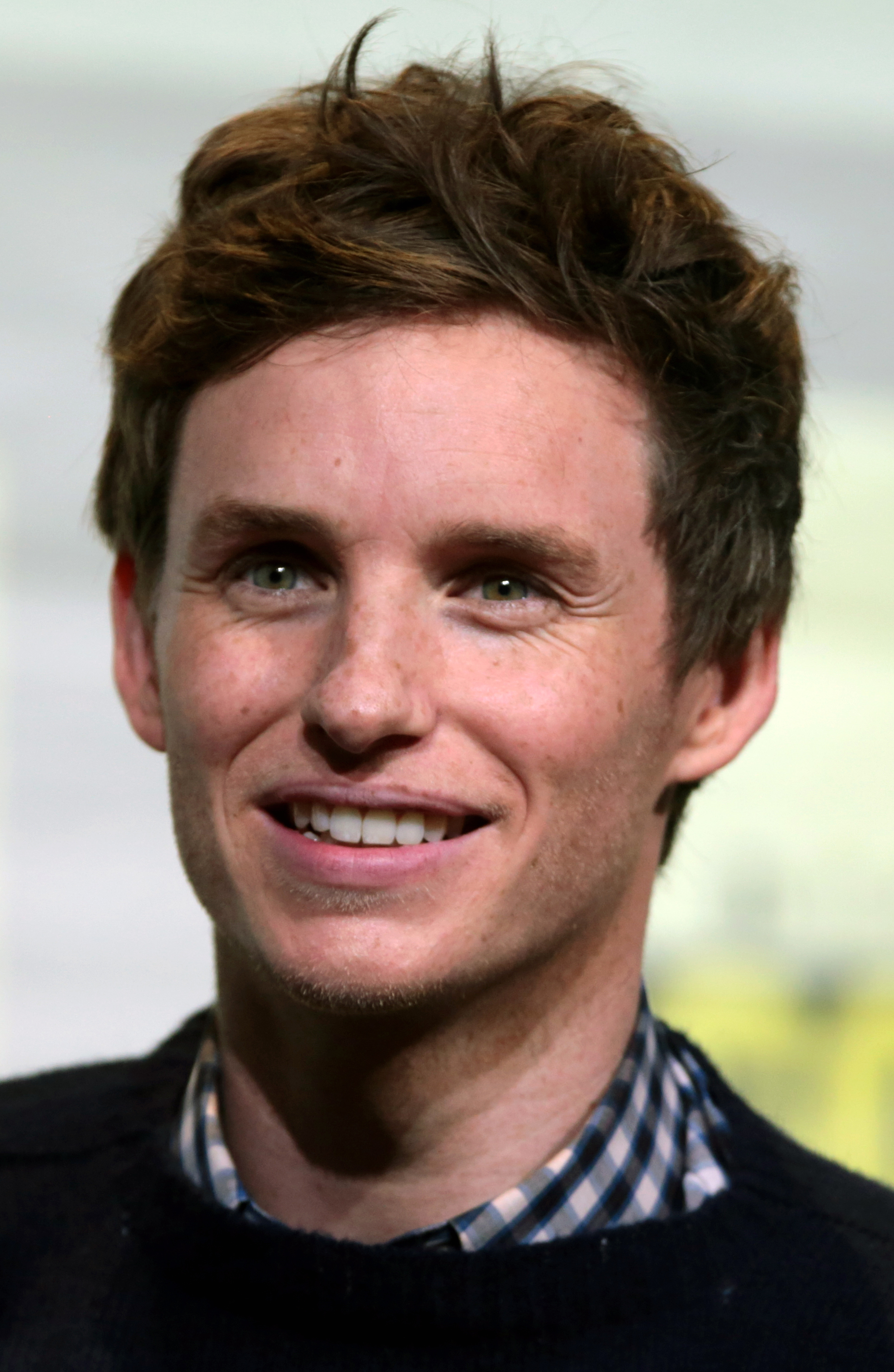
Redmayne at the 2016 San Diego Comic Con

In 2016, Redmayne starred as Newt Scamander in the film adaptation of Fantastic Beasts and Where to Find Them, the first of a series within the Wizarding World of the Harry Potter film series, with a screenplay by J. K. Rowling. Fantastic Beasts was a critical and commercial success. In 2018, Redmayne starred in the stop-motion animated film Early Man, and reprised his role as Newt Scamander in Fantastic Beasts: The Crimes of Grindelwald as well as its third sequel, Fantastic Beasts: The Secrets of Dumbledore, which was released in April 2022. Both The Crimes of Grindelwald and The Secrets of Dumbledore received mixed critical reception but emerged as financial successes. All of J. K. Rowling's Fantastic Beasts films rank among Redmayne's highest-grossing films to date.

In 2020, Redmayne starred as Tom Hayden in The Trial of the Chicago 7. The film earned six nominations at the 93rd Academy Awards. Redmayne received a Screen Actors Guild Award as a member of the cast awarded the Outstanding Performance by a Cast in a Motion Picture honour.

In 2022, Redmayne starred in the biographical crime thriller film, The Good Nurse, playing notorious serial killer Charles Cullen, and was nominated for a Golden Globe Award, a British Academy Film Award, and a Screen Actors Guild Award. Leah Greenblatt at Entertainment Weekly wrote, "an eerie, pitch-perfect Redmayne, wearing Charlie's nice-guy drag like a battering ram, lets his mask slip so incrementally that the final scenes feel like a true terrifying rupture." Aurora Amidon at Paste remarked, "Redmayne plays Charles with such a sense of naturalism and magnetic intensity that it's easy to forget he's not in the room right there with you."

In 2024, he starred in and produced the television series The Day of the Jackal, playing an elusive British assassin code-named the "Jackal". The performance was acclaimed, and he received nominations for a Screen Actor's Guild Award, a Critics Choice Award and a Golden Globe Award. Joel Golby, writing for the Guardian commended Redmayne for playing his "chameleonic and ice-cold" character, and for conveying a lot while having little dialogue; adding that "it's as if he's secretly uncovered a new way of acting". Verne Gay at Newsday remarked, "To the broadest of screen stereotypes - brutal assassin on the run - he adds layer upon layer, nuance upon nuance".

== Public image ==
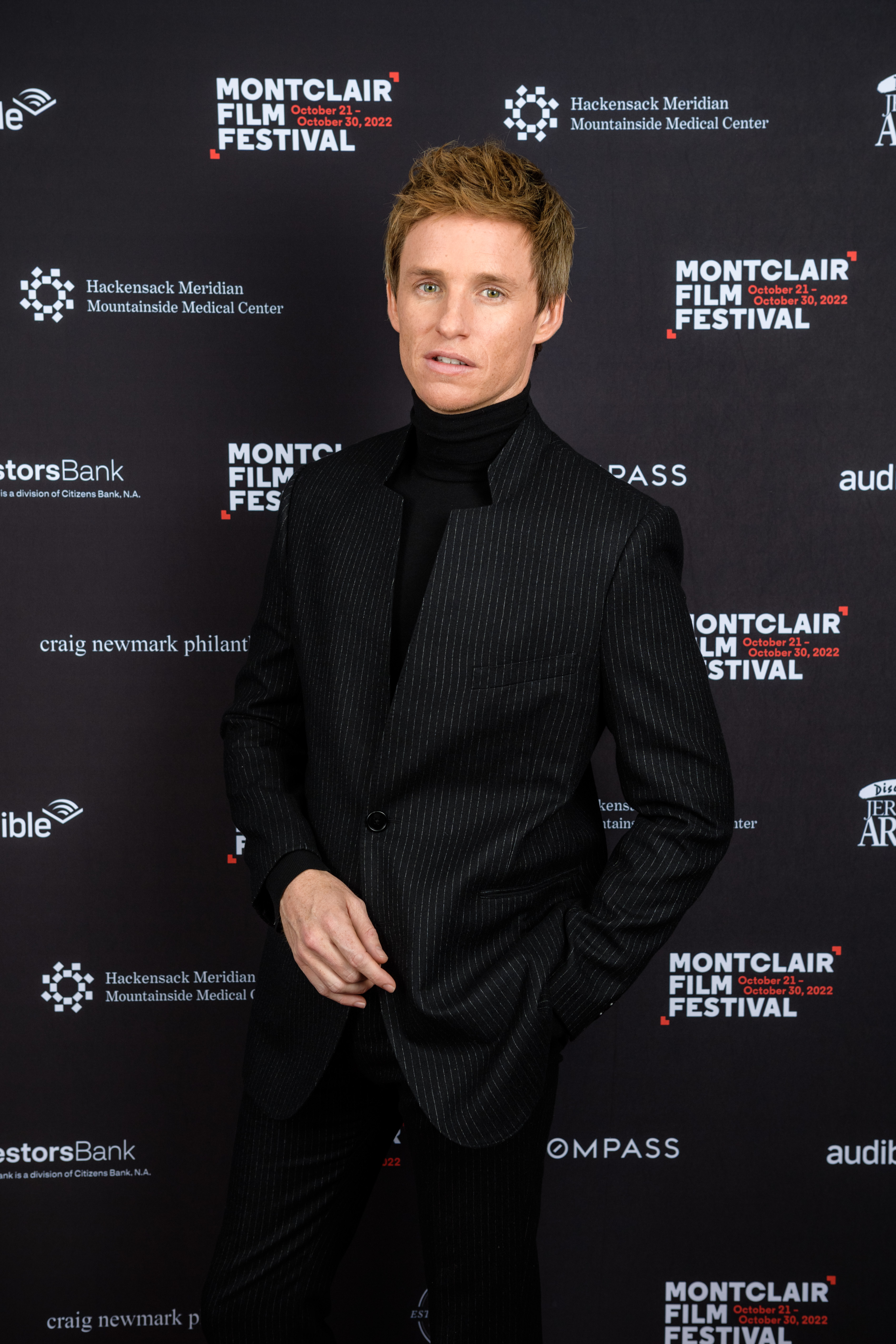
Redmayne in 2022

Redmayne modelled for Burberry in 2008 with Alex Pettyfer, and in 2012 with Cara Delevingne. In 2016, he starred in the Prada Fall/Winter '16 Menswear Advertising Campaign.

Redmayne has been widely admired for his style, with Vogue describing him as having "seemingly preternatural panache on the red carpet, his deft ability to make even the nattiest and most colorful suits seem like second skin." In the September 2012 issue of Vanity Fair, he was featured on its annual International Best Dressed List. In 2015, he was named number one in British GQ's 50 best dressed British men, and then again in 2016. Sir Elton John and David Furnish described him as "the stylish intersection where Cary Grant's style meets Fred Astaire's lithe elegance." GQ also named him as one of "the Most Stylish Men Alive" in 2015 and one of "the 13 Most Stylish Men In The World Right Now" in 2016.

== Personal life ==
Redmayne married Hannah Bagshawe on 15 December 2014. They have a daughter and a son.

Redmayne was appointed Officer of the Order of the British Empire (OBE) in the 2015 Birthday Honours for services to drama.

In August 2014, he was appointed ambassador of film education charity Into Film. He has been a patron of the Motor Neurone Disease Association since 2015, having become associated with the charity following his portrayal of Stephen Hawking. He is an ambassador of the Teenage Cancer Trust. He is a patron of Go Live Theatre Projects (earlier known as Mousetrap Theatre Projects), a charity dedicated to enriching the lives of children and young people through theatre, especially those who are disadvantaged or have additional needs.

== Acting credits ==
=== Film ===
| Year | Title | Role | Notes | Ref. |
|---|---|---|---|---|
| 2006 | Like Minds | Alex Forbes | | |
| 2006 | The Good Shepherd | Edward Wilson Jr. | | |
| 2007 | Elizabeth: The Golden Age | Anthony Babington | | |
| 2007 | Savage Grace | Antony Baekeland | | |
| 2008 | The Other Boleyn Girl | William Stafford | | |
| 2008 | Powder Blue | Qwerty Doolittle | | |
| 2008 | The Yellow Handkerchief | Gordy | | |
| 2009 | Glorious 39 | Ralph Keyes | | |
| 2010 | Black Death | Osmund | | |
| 2011 | Hick | Eddie Kreezer | | |
| 2011 | My Week with Marilyn | Colin Clark | | |
| 2012 | Les Misérables | Marius Pontmercy | | |
| 2014 | The Theory of Everything | Stephen Hawking | | |
| 2015 | Jupiter Ascending | Balem Abrasax | | |
| 2015 | The Danish Girl | Lili Elbe | | |
| 2015 | Thomas & Friends: Sodor's Legend of the Lost Treasure | Ryan | Voice | |
| 2016 | Fantastic Beasts and Where to Find Them | Newt Scamander | | |
| 2018 | Early Man | Dug | Voice | |
| 2018 | Fantastic Beasts: The Crimes of Grindelwald | Newt Scamander | | |
| 2019 | The Aeronauts | James Glaisher | | |
| 2020 | The Trial of the Chicago 7 | Tom Hayden | | |
| 2022 | Fantastic Beasts: The Secrets of Dumbledore | Newt Scamander | | |
| 2022 | The Good Nurse | Charles Cullen | | |
| 2027 | Panic Carefully | TBA | Post-production | |

=== Television ===
| Year | Title | Role | Notes | Ref. |
|---|---|---|---|---|
| 1998 | Animal Ark | John Hardy | Episode: "Bunnies in the Bathroom" | |
| 2003 | Doctors | Rob Huntley | Episode: "Crescendo" | |
| 2005 | Elizabeth I | The Earl of Southampton | Episode: "Southampton" | |
| 2008 | Tess of the d'Urbervilles | Angel Clare | 4 episodes | |
| 2010 | The Miraculous Year | Connor Lynn | Unreleased pilot | |
| 2010 | The Pillars of the Earth | Jack Jackson | 8 episodes | |
| 2012 | Birdsong | Stephen Wraysford | 2 episodes | |
| 2015 | War Art with Eddie Redmayne | Himself | Documentary | |
| 2017 | CBBC Visits the Wizarding World of Harry Potter and Fantastic Beasts | Himself | Documentary | |
| 2018 | Children in Need | Himself | Comedy interview | |
| 2024–present | The Day of the Jackal | The Jackal | Main role; 10 episodes | |

=== Theatre ===
| Year | Title | Role | Venue | Notes | Ref. |
|---|---|---|---|---|---|
| 2002 | Twelfth Night | Viola | Shakespeare's Globe | | |
| 2003 | "Master Harold"...and the Boys | Master Harold | Everyman Theatre | | |
| 2004 | The Goat, or Who Is Sylvia? | Billy | Almeida Theatre | | |
| 2004 | Hecuba | Polydorus | Donmar Warehouse | Off-West End | |
| 2008 | Now or Later | John Jr. | Royal Court Theatre | West End | |
| 2009–2010 | Red | Ken | Donmar Warehouse | Off-West End | |
| 2010 | Red | Ken | John Golden Theatre | Broadway | |
| 2010 | The Children's Monologues | Young boy | Old Vic Theatre | Off-West End | |
| 2011–2012 | Richard II | Richard II | Donmar Warehouse | Off-West End | |
| 2021–2022 | Cabaret | The Emcee | Playhouse Theatre | West End | |
| 2024 | Cabaret | The Emcee | August Wilson Theatre | Broadway | |

=== Video games ===
| Year | Title | Voice role |
|---|---|---|
| 2016 | Lego Dimensions | Newt Scamander |

=== Theme park attractions ===
| Year | Title | Role | Ref. |
|---|---|---|---|
| 2025 | Le Cirque Arcanus | Newt Scamander | |

== Discography ==
=== Music ===
| Year | Title | Author | Role | Ref(s). |
|---|---|---|---|---|
| 2012 | Les Misérables: Highlights from the Motion Picture Soundtrack | Claude-Michel Schönberg & Herbert Kretzmer | Marius Pontmercy | |
| 2023 | Cabaret (2021 London Cast Recording) | John Kander & Fred Ebb | The Emcee | |

=== Audiobooks ===
| Year | Title | Author | Role | Ref(s). |
|---|---|---|---|---|
| 2011 | My Week with Marilyn | Colin Clark | Narrator | |
| 2017 | Fantastic Beasts and Where to Find Them | J.K. Rowling | Narrator | |
| 2021 | Another Year of Wonder: Classical Music for Every Day | Clemency Burton-Hill | Narrator | |

== See also ==
- List of oldest and youngest Academy Award winners and nominees — Youngest winners for Best Lead Actor
- List of British actors
- List of Academy Award winners and nominees from Great Britain
- List of actors with Academy Award nominations
- List of actors with more than one Academy Award nomination in the acting categories
- List of Old Etonians born in the 20th century
- List of University of Cambridge members
