= Tony Cliff =

British socialist activist (1917–2000)

- Tony Cliff in 1986
- Born: Yigael Glückstein; 20 May 1917; Zikhron Ya'akov, Mutasarrifate of Jerusalem, Ottoman Empire
- Died: 9 April 2000 (aged 82); London, England
- Political party: Socialist Workers Party
- Spouse: Chanie Rosenberg
- Children: 3, including Donny Gluckstein
- Relatives: Michael Kidron (brother-in-law), Baroness Kidron (niece), Adam Kidron (nephew)

Tony Cliff (born Yigael Glückstein, Hebrew: יגאל גליקשטיין; 20 May 1917 – 9 April 2000) was a Trotskyist activist. Born to a Jewish family in Ottoman Palestine, he moved to the United Kingdom in 1947 and by the end of the 1950s had assumed the pen name of Tony Cliff. He was a founding member of the Socialist Review Group, which became the International Socialists and then the Socialist Workers Party, in 1977. Cliff was effectively the leader of all three.

== Biography ==
=== Early life in Palestine ===
Tony Cliff was born Yigael Glückstein on 20 May 1917 in Zikhron Ya'akov in the Ottoman Empire's Mutasarrifate of Jerusalem (in what is now Israel), the same year that Britain seized control of the territory from the Ottoman Empire during World War I. He was one of four children born to Akiva and Esther Glückstein, Jewish immigrants from Poland, who had come to Palestine as part of the Second Aliyah. His father was an engineer and contractor. Cliff grew up in British-ruled Mandatory Palestine.

He attended school in Jerusalem, then studied at the Technion in Haifa, before dropping out and studying economics at the Hebrew University of Jerusalem. In his youth, he came to identify with Communism, though he never joined the Palestine Communist Party, as he had not met any of its members before becoming a socialist activist. At fourteen, he joined the youth section of Mapai, and then two years later moved to join Poale Zion. In 1936, Glückstein worked for a year as a building worker, recalling that the experience "immunised me from the four-letter word: work". After that he devoted himself to full-time political work. He also translated two books into Hebrew for money. By the late 1930s, he was a committed Trotskyist and anti-Zionist. During the 1930s he entered into a fictitious marriage with a Jewish woman from Europe to secure her immigration to Palestine. From 1938 to 1946, he was active in the small Trotskyist movement in Palestine.

With the beginning of World War II, Glückstein was active in efforts to oppose the mobilization of Jews to the British war effort, seeing the war as a struggle between imperialists. He was arrested by the British in 1939 and imprisoned at Acre Prison for twelve months. In prison, he met Meir Slonim, general secretary of the Palestine Communist Party, Avraham Stern and Moshe Dayan. In 1940, he made plans to engage in revolutionary activity in Egypt, having become convinced that the Palestinian working class was too weak and that the Egyptian working class would be the key to change in the Middle East, but was dissuaded from doing so upon learning that the small Trotskyist movement there was composed of dilettantes and was not a serious movement capable of supporting him in underground activity. He subsequently continued his political activity in Palestine.

In 1945, he met and then married Chanie Rosenberg, a Jewish socialist immigrant from South Africa. They moved to Tel Aviv that year, with Chanie supporting them financially by working as a teacher.

=== Move to Britain ===
Cliff and Chanie moved to Britain in 1947, but Cliff was never able to become a British citizen and remained a stateless person for the rest of his life. To the end of his life, he spoke English with a distinct Hebrew accent. He was deported by the British authorities and lived in the Republic of Ireland for several years. During this period, he was active in left-wing circles in Dublin, and was acquainted with Owen Sheehy-Skeffington and his wife, Andrée. He was permitted to take up British residency due only to the status of his wife Chanie as a British citizen.

Living in London, Glückstein again became active with the Revolutionary Communist Party, on to the leadership of which he had been co-opted. For most purposes, Glückstein was a supporter of the leadership of the RCP around Jock Haston, and as such he was involved with the discussions concerning the nature of those states dominated by Russia and the Communist parties initiated by a faction within the RCP. This debate was linked to other discussions on the nationalised industries in Britain and the increasingly critical stance of Haston and the RCP as to the leadership of the Fourth International with regard to Eastern Europe and Yugoslavia in particular.

On the break-up of the RCP, Glückstein’s supporters joined Gerry Healy's group The Club although, having been deported to Ireland, Glückstein himself did not. In 1950, he helped launch the Socialist Review Group, which was based on a journal of the same name. This was to be the main publication for which Glückstein wrote during the 1950s, until it was superseded by International Socialism in 1960, eventually ceasing publication altogether in 1962.

By the time he gained permanent residency in Britain, his supporters in The Club had been expelled due to differences on Birmingham Trades Council regarding socialist policy concerning the Korean War, where Glückstein's co-factionalists refused to take a position of support for either side in the war.

Owing to his lack of established residency rights in Britain, and during his earlier exile in Ireland, Glückstein used the name Roger or Roger Tennant as a pseudonym. The first edition of his short book on Rosa Luxemburg in 1959 was possibly the first use of the pen name 'Tony Cliff'. In the 1960s, Cliff would revive many of his earlier pseudonyms in the pages of International Socialism in which journal reviews are to be found by Roger, Roger Tennant, Sakhry, Lee Rock and Tony Cliff, but none by Yigael Glückstein.

=== International Socialists and SWP ===
Glückstein’s group was renamed the International Socialists in 1962, and was to grow from fewer than 100 members in 1960 until it claimed in the region of 3,000 in 1977, at which point it was renamed the Socialist Workers Party (SWP). Cliff remained a leading member until his death in 2000. He was central to the various reorientations carried out in the SWP to react to changes in the position of the working class. In particular, after the high level of strike activity in the early seventies, he argued in the late 1970s that the working-class movement was entering a "downturn" and that the party's activity should be radically changed as a result. A fierce debate ensued, which Cliff's side eventually won. Trotskyist writer Samuel Farber, a long-time supporter of the International Socialist Organization in the US, has argued that the internal party regime established by Cliff during this period is "reminiscent of the one established by Zinoviev in the mid-twenties in the USSR" consequently leading to the various crises and splits in the group later on.

Cliff's biography is, as he himself remarked, inseparable from that of the groups of which he was a leading member.

== Ideology ==
Cliff was a revolutionary socialist in the Trotskyist tradition, attempting to make Vladimir Lenin's theory of the party effective in the present day. Much of his theoretical writing was aimed at the immediate tasks of the party at the time.

Initially, the consensus in most Trotskyist groups was that all the states dominated by Stalinist parties – which are characterised by state planning and state ownership of property – are to be seen as 'degenerated workers' states' (the Soviet Union) or 'deformed workers' states' (other Stalinist states, including much of Eastern Europe). In many ways, Cliff was the main dissident from this idea, although some of his opponents have sought to associate his 'USSR as state capitalism' view (first expressed in The Nature of Stalinist Russia, 1948) with other ideas: for example, the theory of 'bureaucratic collectivism' associated with Shachtmanite Workers Party in the United States. However, Cliff himself was insistent that his ideas owed nothing to those of Max Shachtman, or earlier proponents of the theory such as Bruno Rizzi, and made this clear in his work Bureaucratic Collectivism – A Critique.

Nevertheless, in the 1950s, his group distributed literature published by Shachtman's group and the theory of the 'permanent arms economy', which was considered one of the pillars of what became the International Socialist Tendency, originated with Shachtman's group, though it is sometimes claimed that Cliff refused to acknowledge this publicly.

== Personal life ==
Cliff died on 9 April 2000. He was 82. Shortly before his death, he underwent a major surgical operation on his heart.

Cliff's wife, Chanie Rosenberg (1922–2021), was an active member successively of the SRG, IS and SWP, in which she remained active for many years. As well as authoring many articles on social questions for the group's publications, she was an activist in the National Union of Teachers until her retirement.

In addition, three of the couple's four children became members of the SWP, with one son, Donny Gluckstein, co-authoring two books with his father.

Cliff's brother Chaim was an Israeli journalist, theatre critic, and translator. His uncles included Dr. Hillel Yaffe and the agronomist and Zionist activist Hayim Margolis-Kalwariski. His nephew is the Israeli graphic designer David Tartakover. He was the brother-in-law of cartographer Michael Kidron and the uncle of filmmaker and crossbench peer Beeban, Baroness Kidron.

Cliff is depicted as Jimmy Rock of the Rockers in Tariq Ali's satire Redemption.

== Selected works ==
- The Problem of the Middle East (1946)
- The Nature of Stalinist Russia (1948)
- Stalin's Satellites in Europe (1952)
- Stalinist Russia: A Marxist Analysis (1955)
- Perspectives of the Permanent War Economy (1957)
- Economic Roots of Reformism (1957)
- Rosa Luxemburg: A Study(1959)
- Trotsky on Substitionism (1960)
- Deflected Permanent Revolution (1963)
- Incomes Policy, Legislation and Shop Stewards (with Colin Barker) (1966)
- France: The Struggle Goes On (with Ian Birchall) (1968)
- The Employers’ Offensive, Productivity Deals and how to fight them (1970)
- The Crisis: Social Contract or Socialism (1975)
- Lenin Vol. 1: Building the Party (1975)
- Portugal at the Crossroads (1975)
- Lenin Vol. 2: All Power to the Soviets (1976)
- Lenin Vol. 3: Revolution Besieged (1978)
- Lenin Vol. 4: The Bolsheviks and World Communism (1979)
- Class Struggle and Women’s Liberation, 1640 to today (1984)
- Marxism and trade union struggle, the general strike of 1926 (with Donny Gluckstein) (1986)
- The Labour Party, A Marxist History (with Donny Gluckstein) (1986)
- Trotsky Vol. 1: Towards October 1879-1917 (1989)
- Trotsky Vol. 2: The Sword of the Revolution 1917-1923 (1990)
- Trotsky Vol. 3: Fighting the Rising Stalinist Bureaucracy 1923-1927 (1991)
- Trotsky Vol. 4: The darker the Night, the Brighter the Star 1927-1940 (1993)
- Trotskyism after Trotsky, the origins of the International Socialists (1999)
- A World to Win: Life of a Revolutionary (2000)
- Marxism at the Millennium (2000)

== Archives ==
- Summary description of the Tony Cliff papers held at the Modern Records Centre, University of Warwick Library. Online abstract available. Retrieved 16 June 2006.

== See also ==
- Bureaucratic collectivism
- Deflected permanent revolution
- New class
- Permanent revolution
- State capitalism
- Ted Grant and Gerry Healy – two other former RCP members who went on to found prominent rival Trotskyist parties
