= Carry Greenham Home =

- Directed by: Beeban Kidron, Amanda Richardson
- Distributed by: Concord Media
- Release date: 1983
- Running time: 69 minutes
- Country: England
- Language: English

Carry Greenham Home is a 1983 documentary about the Greenham Common Women's Peace Camp created by Beeban Kidron and Amanda Richardson. It bears the same name as the song by Peggy Seeger. It is considered "the first full-length documentary of a protest camp as a site of ongoing protest and daily living or re-creation."

== Summary ==
The film depicts various activities involving the people of the camp, including nonviolent direct actions, interactions with the media, conflict with law enforcement, and life around the camp.

- The direct actions include sit-ins, the blockage of the entrance gate with a bike lock, unauthorized entry into the base, banner creation, and an event with a 4.5-mile-long textile dragon tail.
- Interactions with the media include discussion with two journalists interviewing activists amidst the camp, someone explaining her perspective to a cameraperson, and someone performing cartwheels in the background as a reporter describes their surroundings.
- Conflict with law enforcement includes a court appearance, demonstrators being carried away by police, and forced removal of cars belonging to the residents of the camp.
- Moments of life around the camp include cooking, childbirth, a group meeting and a discussion of finances.

Despite the intense subject matter, the film does not depict much spirituality. The film has also been noted for its portrayal of visual symbolism, including "handmade sweaters adorned with feminist and pacifist emblems."

== Music ==
The film features protest music, including the titular song, "Reclaim the Night," "We are singing for our lives," "We are women" to the melody of Frère Jacques, and a version of "Which Side Are You On?," evoking Barbara Kopple's Harlan County, USA. The film has been interpreted as documenting how music can build collective identity, and the folk style has been interpreted as reflecting the timelessness of their messages. The phrase "Carry Greenham Home" took on a meaning of solidarity away from the site of the camp, and its use in this manner was a source of confusion for a character in Ali Smith's Winter.

== Production ==
Kidron and Richardson began recording video for a university course as film students in December 1982 and stayed at the camp to record for seven months, but only assembled the footage in summer 1983, prompted by negative media coverage of the camp. Kidron said that "Then it seemed necessary." Kidron also stated that they were surrounded by all male film crews at the "Embrace the Base" demonstration in 1982, and that the police accepted the male crews while the protestors welcomed Beeban and Kidron, drawing them into participating in the protest themselves. It was produced on 16 mm film.

== Distribution ==
Carry Greenham Home's distribution was unconventional; it was distributed independently, with much involvement from the filmmakers. It was played "in meeting halls, church basements and school classrooms, often with a Greenham protestor or two on hand for discussion."

== Awards ==
The film won a Gold Hugo at the Chicago Film Festival and was a finalist for Best Documentary at the Grierson British Documentary Awards.
