= Antonia and Jane =

Film by Beeban Kidron

- Written by: Marcy Kahan
- Directed by: Beeban Kidron
- Starring: Imelda Staunton; Saskia Reeves
- Music by: Rachel Portman
- Country of origin: United Kingdom
- Original language: English

Production
- Producer: George Faber
- Cinematography: Rex Maidment
- Editor: Kate Evans
- Running time: 77 minutes
- Production company: BBC Films

Original release
- Network: BBC2
- Release: 11 October 1991

Antonia and Jane is a 1990 comedy film directed by Beeban Kidron and starring Saskia Reeves and Imelda Staunton in the title roles, shown in ScreenPlay on 18 July 1990. It is about two mismatched woman friends who have had a love–hate relationship with each other since childhood. The story is told in flashback episodes as narrated by the two characters to their counsellor, prior to their annual dinner date.

== Cast ==
- Imelda Staunton as Jane Hartman
- Saskia Reeves as Antonia McGill
- Brenda Bruce as the Therapist
- Bill Nighy as Howard Nash
