= List of awards and nominations received by Eddie Redmayne =

Eddie Redmayne awards and nominations
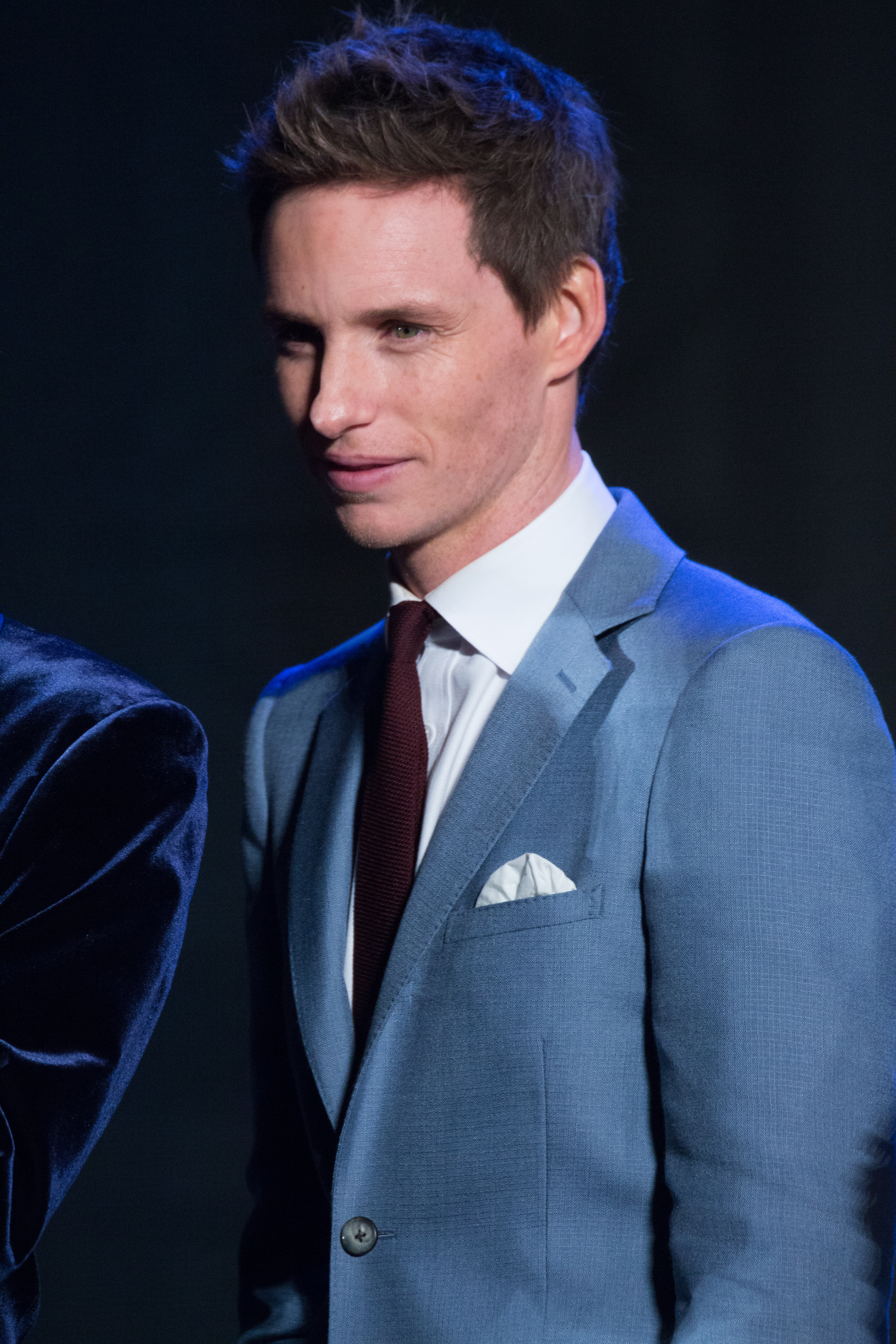
- Redmayne in 2016
Awards and nominations
Award	Wins	Nominations
Academy Awards	1	2
British Academy Film Awards	1	3
Golden Globe Awards	1	4
Laurence Olivier Awards	2	3
Tony Awards	1	3
Screen Actors Guild Awards	2	8

English actor Eddie Redmayne has received multiple accolades for his film, television and stage performances. His major nominations include two Academy Awards, three British Academy Film Awards, two Golden Globe Awards, three Laurence Olivier Awards, five Screen Actors Guild Awards, and three Tony Awards, with a win each at the Academy Awards, the British Academy Film Awards, the Tony Awards, and the Golden Globes, and two wins each at the Laurence Olivier Awards and the Screen Actors Guild Awards.

In 2010, he won a Laurence Olivier Award and a Tony Award for Best Supporting Actor for his performance in Red, and in 2014, he won the Academy Award, Screen Actors Guild Award, British Academy Film Award, and Golden Globe Award for Best Actor in a Leading Role for his performance as Stephen Hawking in The Theory of Everything.

== Major associations ==
=== Academy Awards ===
Year	Nominated work	Category	Result	Ref.
2015	The Theory of Everything	Best Actor	Won	
2016	The Danish Girl	Best Actor	Nominated	

=== BAFTA Awards ===
Year	Nominated work	Category	Result	Ref.
2012	—	BAFTA Rising Star Award	Nominated	
2015	The Theory of Everything	Best Actor in a Leading Role	Won	
2016	The Danish Girl	Best Actor in a Leading Role	Nominated	
2023	The Good Nurse	Best Actor in a Supporting Role	Nominated	

=== Golden Globe Awards ===
Year	Nominated work	Category	Result	Ref.
2015	The Theory of Everything	Best Actor in a Motion Picture – Drama	Won	
2016	The Danish Girl	Best Actor in a Motion Picture – Drama	Nominated	
2023	The Good Nurse	Best Supporting Actor – Motion Picture	Nominated	
2025	The Day of the Jackal	Best Actor in a Television Series – Drama	Nominated	

=== Laurence Olivier Awards ===
Year	Nominated work	Category	Result	Ref.
2005	The Goat, or Who Is Sylvia?	Best Supporting Actor in a Play	Nominated	
2010	Red	Best Supporting Actor in a Play	Won	
2022	Cabaret	Best Actor in a Musical	Won	

=== Screen Actors Guild Awards ===
Year	Nominated work	Category	Result	Ref.
2013	Les Misérables	Outstanding Performance by a Cast in a Motion Picture	Nominated	
2015	The Theory of Everything	Outstanding Performance by a Cast in a Motion Picture	Nominated	
2015	The Theory of Everything	Outstanding Performance by a Male Actor in a Leading Role in a Motion Picture	Won	
2016	The Danish Girl	Outstanding Performance by a Male Actor in a Leading Role in a Motion Picture	Nominated	
2021	The Trial of the Chicago 7	Outstanding Performance by a Cast in a Motion Picture	Won	
2023	The Good Nurse	Outstanding Performance by a Male Actor in a Supporting Role in a Motion Picture	Nominated	
2025	The Day of the Jackal	Outstanding Performance by a Male Actor in a Drama Series	Nominated	
2025	The Day of the Jackal	Outstanding Performance by an Ensemble in a Drama Series	Nominated	

=== Tony Awards ===
Year	Nominated work	Category	Result	Ref.
2010	Red	Best Featured Actor in a Play	Won	
2024	Cabaret	Best Leading Actor in a Musical	Nominated	
2024	Cabaret	Best Revival of a Musical	Nominated	

== Miscellaneous awards ==
=== Annie Awards ===
Year	Nominated work	Category	Result	Ref(s)
2018	Early Man	Annie Award for Voice Acting in a Feature Production	Nominated	

=== Broadway.com Audience Awards ===
Year	Nominated work	Category	Result	Ref(s)
2024	Cabaret at the Kit Kat Club	Favorite Leading Actor in a Musical	Nominated	

=== Critics' Choice Movie Awards ===
Year	Nominated work	Category	Result	Ref(s)
2012	Les Misérables	Best Acting Ensemble	Nominated	
2014	The Theory of Everything	Best Actor	Nominated	
2015	The Danish Girl	Best Actor	Nominated	
2021	The Trial of the Chicago 7	Best Acting Ensemble	Won	

=== Critics' Choice Television Awards ===
Year	Nominated work	Category	Result	Ref(s)
2025	The Day of the Jackal	Best Actor in a Drama Series	Nominated	

=== Drama Desk Awards ===
Year	Nominated work	Category	Result	Ref(s)
2010	Red	Outstanding Actor in a Play	Nominated	
2024	Cabaret	Outstanding Revival Of A Musical	Nominated	

=== Empire Awards ===
Year	Nominated work	Category	Result	Ref(s)
2015	The Theory of Everything	Jameson Best Actor	Nominated	
2017	Fantastic Beasts and Where to Find Them	Best Actor	Won	

=== MTV Movie Awards ===
Year	Nominated work	Category	Result	Ref(s)
2013	Les Misérables	Best Breakthrough Performance	Nominated	
2015	The Theory of Everything	Best On-Screen Transformation	Nominated	

=== Satellite Awards ===
Year	Nominated work	Category	Result	Ref(s)
2012	Les Misérables	Best Supporting Actor – Motion Picture	Nominated	
2012	Les Misérables	Best Cast – Motion Picture	Won	
2014	The Theory of Everything	Best Actor	Nominated	
2015	The Danish Girl	Best Actor	Nominated	
2022	The Good Nurse	Best Supporting Actor – Motion Picture	Nominated	

=== Teen Choice Awards ===
Year	Nominated work	Category	Result	Ref(s)
2013	Les Misérables	Choice Movie Actor: Romance	Nominated	
2013	Les Misérables	Choice Movie Breakout	Nominated	
2015	The Theory of Everything	Choice Movie Actor: Drama	Nominated	
2017	Fantastic Beasts and Where to Find Them	Choice Movie: Fantasy Actor	Nominated	

== Other awards and nominations ==
=== AACTA Awards ===
Year	Nominated work	Category	Result	Ref(s)
2014	The Theory of Everything	Best International Actor	Nominated	
2015	The Danish Girl	Best International Actor	Nominated	

=== Alliance of Women Film Journalists ===
Year	Nominated work	Category	Result	Ref(s)
2015	The Theory of Everything	Best Actor	Nominated	
2016	The Danish Girl	Best Actor	Nominated	
2022	The Good Nurse	Best Actor in a Supporting Role	Nominated	

=== Awards Circuit Community Awards ===
Year	Nominated work	Category	Result	Ref(s)
2012	Les Misérables	Best Cast Ensemble	Won	
2015	The Theory of Everything	Best Actor in a Leading Role	Runner-up	

=== Berlin International Film Festival ===
Year	Nominated work	Category	Result	Ref(s)
2007	The Good Shepherd	Outstanding Artistic Contribution	Won	

=== Capri Hollywood International Film Festival ===
Year	Nominated work	Category	Result	Ref(s)
2011	My Week with Marilyn	Capri Ensemble Cast Award	Won	
2023	The Good Nurse	Best Supporting Actor	Won	

=== Central Ohio Film Critics Association ===
Year	Nominated work	Category	Result	Ref(s)
2012	Les Misérables	Best Film	Nominated	
2014	The Theory of Everything	Best Actor	Nominated	

=== Chicago Film Critics Association ===
Year	Nominated work	Category	Result	Ref(s)
2014	The Theory of Everything	Best Actor	Nominated	
2015	The Danish Girl	Best Actor	Nominated	

=== Critics' Circle Theatre Awards ===
Year	Nominated work	Category	Result	Ref(s)
2004	The Goat or Who is Sylvia?	The Jack Tinker Award for Most Promising Newcomer	Won	
2011	Richard II	John and Wendy Trewin Award for Best Shakespearean Performance	Won	

=== Dallas–Fort Worth Film Critics Association ===
Year	Nominated work	Category	Result	Ref(s)
2014	The Theory of Everything	Best Actor	Runner-up	

=== Denver Film Critics Society ===
Year	Nominated work	Category	Result	Ref(s)
2014	The Theory of Everything	Best Actor	Nominated	

=== Detroit Film Critics Society ===
Year	Nominated work	Category	Result	Ref(s)
2014	The Theory of Everything	Best Actor	Nominated	

=== Dorian Awards ===
Year	Nominated work	Category	Result	Ref(s)
2014	The Theory of Everything	Film Performance of the Year – Actor	Won	
2024	Cabaret	Outstanding Lead Performance in a Broadway Musical	Nominated	

=== Drama League Awards ===
Year	Nominated work	Category	Result	Ref(s)
2010	Red	The Distinguished Performance Award	Nominated	
2024	Cabaret	Distinguished Performance Award	Nominated	

=== Elle Style Awards ===
Year	Nominated work	Category	Result	Ref(s)
2012	—N/a	Best Actor	Won	

=== Evening Standard British Film Award ===
Year	Nominated work	Category	Result	Ref(s)
2012	Les Misérables	Best Actor	Nominated	

=== Evening Standard Theatre Awards ===
Year	Nominated work	Category	Result	Ref(s)
2004	The Goat or Who Is Sylvia?	Outstanding Newcomer	Won	

=== Florida Film Critics Circle ===
Year	Nominated work	Category	Result	Ref(s)
2014	The Theory of Everything	Best Actor	Nominated	
2015	The Danish Girl	Best Actor	Nominated	

=== Georgia Film Critics Association ===
Year	Nominated work	Category	Result	Ref(s)
2014	The Theory of Everything	Best Actor	Nominated	

=== Giffoni Film Festival Awards ===
Year	Nominee/Work	Category	Result	Ref(s)
2013	Eddie Redmayne	Giffoni Experience Award	Won	

=== Golden Raspberry Awards ===
Year	Nominated work	Category	Result	Ref(s)
2015	Jupiter Ascending	Worst Supporting Actor	Won	

=== GQ Men of the Year Awards ===
Year	Nominated work	Category	Result	Ref(s)
2013	—N/a	Rémy Martin Breakthrough Award	Won	

=== Hollywood Film Award ===
Year	Nominated work	Category	Result	Ref(s)
2014	The Theory of Everything	Hollywood Breakout Performance Actor	Won	

=== Houston Film Critics Society ===
Year	Nominated work	Category	Result	Ref(s)
2014	The Theory of Everything	Best Actor	Nominated	

=== Iowa Film Critics ===
Year	Nominated work	Category	Result	Ref(s)
2015	The Theory of Everything	Best Actor	Runner-up (Note: Tied with Benedict Cumberbatch for The Imitation Game.)	

=== Irish Film and Television Awards ===
Year	Nominated work	Category	Result	Ref(s)
2015	The Theory of Everything	Best International Actor	Won	

=== Kansas City Film Critics Circle ===
Year	Nominated work	Category	Result	Ref(s)
2015	The Danish Girl	Best Actor	Nominated	

=== London Film Critics' Circle ===
Year	Nominated work	Category	Result	Ref(s)
2015	The Theory of Everything	Actor of the Year	Nominated	
2015	The Theory of Everything	British Actor of the Year	Nominated	

=== Montclair Film Festival ===
Year	Nominated work	Category	Result	Ref(s)
2022	The Good Nurse	Performance of the Year Award	Won	

=== National Board of Review ===
Year	Nominated work	Category	Result	Ref(s)
2012	Les Misérables	Best Acting by an Ensemble	Won	

=== Newport Beach Film Festival ===
Year	Nominated work	Category	Result	Ref(s)
2022	—N/a	Icon Award	Won	

=== New York Film Critics Online ===
Year	Nominated work	Category	Result	Ref(s)
2014	The Theory of Everything	Best Actor	Won	

=== Online Film & Television Association ===
Year	Nominated work	Category	Result	Ref(s)
2013	Les Misérables (Empty Chairs At Empty Tables)	Best Adapted Song	Nominated	
2013	Les Misérables (One Day More)	Best Adapted Song	Nominated	
2013	Les Misérables	Best Breakthrough Performance – Male	Won	
2014	The Theory of Everything	Best Actor	Nominated	

=== Palm Springs International Film Festival ===
Year	Nominated work	Category	Result	Ref(s)
2015	The Theory of Everything	Desert Palm Achievement Award	Won	

=== Phoenix Film Critics Circle ===
Year	Nominated work	Category	Result	Ref(s)
2014	The Theory of Everything	Best Actor	Nominated	

=== Phoenix Film Critics Society ===
Year	Nominated work	Category	Result	Ref(s)
2012	Les Miserables	Best Ensemble Cast	Nominated	
2014	The Theory of Everything	Best Actor	Nominated	

=== San Diego Film Critics Society ===
Year	Nominated work	Category	Result	Ref(s)
2012	Les Misérables	Best Performance by an Ensemble	Nominated	
2014	The Theory of Everything	Best Actor	Nominated	

=== San Francisco Film Critics Circle Awards ===
Year	Nominated work	Category	Result	Ref(s)
2014	The Theory of Everything	Best Actor	Nominated	

=== Santa Barbara International Film Festival ===
Year	Nominated work	Category	Result	Ref(s)
2013	Les Misérables	Virtuoso Award	Won	
2015	The Theory of Everything	Cinema Vanguard Award	Won	

=== SCAD Savannah Film Festival ===
Year	Nominated work	Category	Result	Ref(s)
2022	-	Virtuoso Award	Won	

=== Southeastern Film Critics Association ===
Year	Nominated work	Category	Result	Ref(s)
2014	The Theory of Everything	Best Actor	Runner-up	

=== St. Louis Film Critics Association ===
Year	Nominated work	Category	Result	Ref(s)
2014	The Theory of Everything	Best Actor	Nominated	
2015	The Danish Girl	Best Actor	Nominated	

=== Tallinn Black Nights Film Festival ===
Year	Nominated work	Category	Result	Ref(s)
2014	The Theory of Everything	Best Actor	Won	

=== The Hollywood Reporter ===
Year	Nominated work	Category	Result	Ref(s)
2014	The Theory of Everything	Breakthrough In Film Award	Won	

=== Theatre World Award ===
Year	Nominated work	Category	Result	Ref(s)
2010	Red	—N/a	Won	

=== Turin Film Festival ===
Year	Nominated work	Category	Result	Ref(s)
2014	The Theory of Everything	Maserati Torino Award	Won	

=== Vancouver Film Critics Circle Awards ===
Year	Nominated work	Category	Result	Ref(s)
2015	The Danish Girl	Best Actor	Nominated	

=== Washington D.C. Area Film Critics Association ===
Year	Nominated work	Category	Result	Ref(s)
2012	Les Misérables	Best Ensemble	Won	
2014	The Theory of Everything	Best Actor	Nominated	
2015	The Danish Girl	Best Actor	Nominated	

=== WhatsOnStage Awards ===
Year	Nominated work	Category	Result	Ref(s)
2009	Now or Later	The SPOTLIGHT Best Actor in a Play	Nominated	
2022	Cabaret	Best Performer in a Male-Identifying Role	Won	

=== Women Film Critics Circle ===
Year	Nominated work	Category	Result	Ref(s)
2014	The Theory of Everything	Best Actor	Won	
2015	The Danish Girl	Best Actor	Won	

=== Zurich Film Festival ===
Year	Nominated work	Category	Result	Ref(s)
2022	-	Golden Eye Award	Won	
