= Pluto Press =

British independent book publishing house

- Status: Active
- Founded: 1969; 57 years ago
- Founder: Richard Kuper
- Country of origin: United Kingdom
- Headquarters location: London, N6
- Distribution: Marston Book Services (UK); Chicago Distribution Center (US)
- Key people: Veruschka Selbach (CEO); David Castle (Editorial Director)
- Publication types: Books
- Nonfiction topics: Left-wing and far-left politics
- Official website: www.plutobooks.com

Pluto Press is a British independent book publisher based in London, founded in 1969.

Pluto Press states that it publishes "radical, left‐wing non‐fiction books", and is anti-capitalist and internationalist. It belongs to The International Alliance of Independent Publishers.

It has published works by Karl Marx, Mark "Chopper" Read, Frantz Fanon, Noam Chomsky, bell hooks, Edward Said, Augusto Boal, Vandana Shiva, Susan George, Ilan Pappé, Nick Robins, Raya Dunayevskaya, Graham Turner, Alastair Crooke, Gabriel Kolko, Hamid Dabashi, Tommy McKearney, Amal Saad-Ghorayeb, Syed Saleem Shahzad, David Cronin, John Holloway, Euclid Tsakalotos, Graham Usher, David Miller and Jonathan Cook.

== History: 1969–1987 ==
Pluto Press was set up in London by Richard Kuper in 1969 to support and promote political debate and activism. Its Trotskyist agenda stemmed from its early association with the International Socialists, which broadened to a wider revolutionary left in 1972 when Nina Kidron and Michael Kidron joined. Anne Benewick and Ric Sissons joined soon after, and the team eventually reached 16 in number. Pluto Press has been described as "one of the most influential socialist publishing houses of that time". Publishing extensively in the areas of movement history, race politics, Ireland, feminism and sexual politics, early successes included Sheila Rowbotham's Hidden from History: 300 years of women's oppression and the fight against it. and Patrick Kinnersley's Hazards of Work.

Series published during this period include: the Workers' Handbooks; the Marxism Series; Ideas in Action; Militarism, State and Society series; Pluto Plays; Arguments for Socialism; Pluto Crime; Liberation Classics in the 1980s; and the Big Red Diaries. The most successful was the State of the World Atlas series by Michael Kidron and Ronald Segal – visual encapsulations of major social and political trends – which were created and produced by Pluto Press and published by Pan Books.

The target readership was reached by selling directly to trades unions, women's organisations and networks, student unions, and theatre audiences as well as through the network of radical bookshops that emerged in the 1970s. Pluto Press became a distributor and co-publisher of titles generated by Urizen Books and South End Press in the US, and Ink Links in the UK, as well as distributor for Counter-Information Services, History Workshop, Feminist Review and others. A trade sales organisation, Volume Sales, was set up in partnership with Allison & Busby, under the direction of Ric Sissons (who later ran Pluto Australia). New departures in publishing included working with Max Stafford-Clark and the Royal Court Theatre to encourage theatre-goers to read playscripts by printing programmes that included the entire play. In 1987, Pluto Press was bought by Roger van Zwanenberg and Norman Drake. Drake later sold his shares to van Zwanenberg.

== University of Michigan Press controversy ==
Prior to Palgrave Macmillan, Pluto Press was distributed by The University of Michigan Press in the United States. However, in June 2008, The University of Michigan Press terminated this relationship after new guidelines were established for its relationships with external publishing houses. The decision came after a series of events tied to the distribution of a 2007 Pluto Press book, Overcoming Zionism (written by then Bard College professor Joel Kovel), which argues for a "one state" solution to the Israeli–Palestinian conflict. After briefly resuming the redistribution, the University of Michigan finally ceased it in 2008, observing that Pluto Press does not undertake peer review of the finished manuscripts it publishes. This rationale was described as "a facade" by Roger van Zwanenberg, chairman of Pluto Press, who says that the University of Michigan knew that Pluto's peer review process "is not identical to that of a university press."

== Pluto Journals ==
Launched in 2009, Pluto Journals publishes several open-access journals. As of 2022, the following journals are active:

- Arab Studies Quarterly
- Bethlehem University Journal
- Decolonial Horizons / Horizontes Decoloniales
- Groundings: The Journal of the Walter Rodney Foundation
- Institute of Employment Rights Journal
- International Journal of Critical Diversity Studies
- International Journal of Cuban Studies
- International Journal of Disability and Social Justice
- Islamophobia Studies Journal
- Journal for the Study of Indentureship and its Legacies
- Journal of Fair Trade
- Journal of Global Faultlines
- Journal of Intersectionality
- Policy Perspectives
- Prometheus. Critical Studies in Innovation
- ReOrient: The Journal of Critical Muslim Studies
- Socialist Lawyer
- State Crime Journal
- Work Organisation, Labour & Globalisation
- World Review of Political Economy
- Zanj: The Journal of Critical Global South Studies
