= James Redmayne =

English cricketer

Personal information
- Full name: James Richard Studdert Redmayne
- Born: 16 July 1979 (age 47); Westminster, London, England
- Batting: Right-handed

Domestic team information
- Years: Team
- 2000: Oxford Universities
- 2000–2002: Oxford University
- 2002: Oxford UCCE

Career statistics
Competition	First-class
Matches	6
Runs scored	245
Batting average	30.62
100s/50s	–/2
Top score	75*
Catches/stumpings	–/–
- Source: Cricinfo, 21 June 2020

James Richard Studdert Redmayne (born 16 July 1979) is an English former first-class cricketer.

== Life ==
=== Cricket ===
The son of Richard Redmayne, who is a businessman in corporate finance, and Patricia (née Burke), who runs a relocation business, he was born the first of their three boys (his younger brothers are the actor Eddie Redmayne (born 6 January 1982) and Thomas Redmayne (b.1987).) at Westminster in July 1979. He was educated at Eton College, before going up to Trinity College, Oxford. While studying at Oxford, Redmayne played first-class cricket. He made his debut for a combined Oxford Universities team against Gloucestershire at Bristol in 2000. He made two further first-class appearances for Oxford Universities in 2000, in addition to playing for Oxford University against Cambridge University in that years University Match. He didn't feature in first-class cricket in 2001, but did play twice in 2002, making an appearance each for Oxford UCCE against Northamptonshire, (Note: Oxford UCCE differed from Oxford University Cricket Club in that it was open to students at Oxford Brookes University, whereas Oxford University Cricket Club is exclusively for students of the constituent colleges of the University of Oxford.) and for Oxford in The University Match. In six first-class matches, Redmayne scored 245 runs at an average of 30.62, with a high score of 75 not out.

=== Personal life ===
After graduating from Oxford, Redmayne was employed as an investment banker for Goldman Sachs in London. He joined CVC Capital Partners in 2005, holding a number of positions within the company in London and then Hong Kong, where he was employed most recently as a senior managing director. He joined Searchlight Capital in June 2020.

His brother is the actor Eddie Redmayne, while their paternal great-grandfather was Sir Richard Redmayne, a civil and mining engineer.
