= Michael Kidron =

Revolutionary theoretician and socialist

- Born: 20 September 1930; Union of South Africa
- Died: 25 March 2003 (aged 72)
- Education: Hebrew University of Jerusalem
- Occupation: Cartographer
- Notable work: The State of the World Atlas
- Children: 5, including Adam Kidron and Beeban Kidron

Michael Kidron (20 September 1930 – 25 March 2003) was a British cartographer. He was one of the early founders of the International Socialists (the forerunners of the Socialist Workers Party or SWP) through the 1960s and 1970s, and the first editor of International Socialism journal. He is perhaps best remembered for writing The State of the World Atlas, jointly with Ronald Segal and Dan Smith.

== Early life and career ==
Kidron was born on 20 September 1930 in the Union of South Africa to a family of Jewish Zionists. He joined his parents in Palestine just after the Second World War, and soon rejected Zionism. After schooling in Tel Aviv, he studied economics at the Hebrew University of Jerusalem. Following emigration to the United Kingdom, he was accepted for doctoral studies at Balliol College, Oxford in 1955 under the supervision of Thomas Balogh.

Kidron became a theoretician in the Socialist Review Group (SRG) and was to be found in the extended family of Tony Cliff, who had married Kidron's sister Chanie Rosenberg, which was the informal core of the group. He would also serve as editor and writer on various group publications through these early years.

It is Kidron's name that appears as publisher of the first public edition of Cliff's work State Capitalism in Russia, which was published in 1955. A small pamphlet on automation appeared in 1956, which although not dissimilar to the ideas of the Johnson-Forest Tendency or Socialisme ou Barbarie did not simply dismiss existing workers organisations as these tended to do. From then on, Kidron was a major source of theoretical writing within the SRG and later the Socialist Workers Party.

== Economic writings ==
Among Kidron's many writings were Western Capitalism Since the War and Capitalism and Theory (1968). His main contribution was to develop the theory of the permanent arms economy, which argued that capitalism had been temporarily stabilised by the production of arms, which acted as a counter tendency to the falling rate of profit. Crisis, then, was not eliminated from the system, but merely postponed. This came at a time when other tendencies were emblazoning their publications with banner headlines proclaiming that capitalism had entered its final crisis. Related to this was the conception that state capitalism was a distinct period within the imperialist stage of capitalism and not simply a new label to be plastered upon the Russian state.

These ideas and experience of the workers movement in Britain were to develop a deeply rooted understanding in Kidron's writings that the revolutionary movement must be democratic in order to fit the working class to rule. The permanent arms economy theory also meant that this analysis was reflected in the understanding of the International Socialists that the 'locus of reformism' had moved from parliamentary bodies to the shop floor. In short workers were seeking gains through localised class struggle at the point of production where the institution of the elected and recallable shop steward was key. The task of revolutionaries was to generalise and politicise such struggles.

Kidron was critical of the move within the International Socialists to a more traditionally democratic centralist structure in the wake of the events of 1968, and as the International Socialists grew, he moved away from its core, both physically, obtaining an academic post in Kingston upon Hull, and politically. Nonetheless, he took no direct part in the factional struggle which saw a split in the central IS cadre in 1975.

== Later work ==
Kidron's last major articles in the journal International Socialism cast doubt on his own earlier work, but without renouncing Marxism as so many former revolutionaries would during the downturn of class struggle that marked the 1980s. Yet following a debate in the pages of International Socialism with Chris Harman, who defended what is now the traditional IS position, Kidron was to leave active revolutionary politics.

He was closely associated with Pluto Press since the early 1970s (IS had helped set up the company in its first period), and his talents were expended on works such as The State of the World Atlas (as of 2013 in its 9th edition), and The War Atlas (as of 2003 in its 4th edition), both with Dan Smith. Kidron remained a Marxist committed to changing the world and therefore understood the necessity of developing a theoretical understanding of how the world works precisely in order to change it. His final article appeared in the Autumn 2002 issue of International Socialism on "The Decline of Capitalism", and spoke of a sure and certain knowledge that another world is not just possible but demanded. As ever, the revolutionary role of the working class in the core countries of capitalism was reasserted and the goal of a communist society reaffirmed.

Mike Kidron had five children; Adam, Beeban, Cassia, Petra and Ruby.

Kidron died on 25 March 2003 at the age of 72. In 2018, Haymarket Books published Capitalism and theory: Selected Writings of Michael Kidron, edited and with an introduction by Richard Kuper.
