= Ronald Segal =

South African journalist and anti-apartheid activist (1932–2008)

- Born: Ronald Michael Segal; 14 July 1932; South Africa
- Died: 23 February 2008 (aged 75)
- Education: Sea Point Boys' High School; University of Cape Town; Trinity College, Cambridge
- Occupations: Activist, writer and editor
- Notable work: The State of the World Atlas

Ronald Michael Segal (14 July 1932 – 23 February 2008) was a South African activist, writer and editor, founder of the anti-apartheid magazine Africa South and the Penguin African Library.

== Life ==
Ronald Segal was born on 14 July 1932, into a rich South African Jewish family. He was educated at Sea Point Boys' High School, before studying at the University of Cape Town and then Trinity College, Cambridge.

Returning to South Africa in 1956, he founded the anti-apartheid magazine Africa South. After the 1960 Sharpeville massacre, he went into exile with Oliver Tambo, and settled in England, continuing his anti-apartheid political activity and pursuing activity as a writer. Segal's best-known work is The State of the World Atlas (first edition, 1981), which he co-founded with Michael Kidron, another South African-born Jew, who shared most of his political views.

In 1962, he married Susan Wolff, daughter of solicitor Eric Wolff and Camille, née Cohen, whose own mother was a Sieff, of the Marks & Spencer family. They had a son and two daughters. The family lived at Walton-on-Thames, in "a fine manor house".

After Segal was unbanned from South Africa, he visited the country several times, receiving a hero's welcome on stage alongside Mandela, Tambo and Slovo in 1992. Segal died on 23 February 2008.

== Works ==
- Tokolosh of the Townships, 1960 [3]
- Political Africa: A Who’s Who of Personalities and Parties, 1961
- African Profiles, 1962
- Into Exile, 1963
- Sanctions against South Africa, 1964
- The Anguish of India, 1965
- The Race War: The Worldwide Conflict of Races, 1966
- America’s Receding Future
- The Americans: A Conflict of Creed and Reality, 1969
- The Struggle Against History, 1971
- Whose Jerusalem? The Conflicts of Israel, 1973
- Decline and Fall of the American Dollar, 1974
- Southern Africa: New Politics of Revolution, 1976
- Leon Trotsky: a biography, 1979
- (with Michael Kidron) The State of the World Atlas, 1981
- The Black Diaspora, 1995
- Islam's Black Slaves: The Other Black Diaspora, 2001
