= Chanie Rosenberg =

Political activist (1922–2021)

Chanie Rosenberg (20 April 1922 – June 2021) was a South African-born artist, teacher and socialist. She was the sister of Michael Kidron, the partner of Tony Cliff, and a founder member of the Socialist Workers Party in Britain.

== Life ==
Chanie Rosenberg was born in South Africa to a Jewish Zionist family originally from Lithuania. A relative was the poet Isaac Rosenberg. She studied Hebrew at Cape Town University. In 1944, she moved to Palestine to live on a kibbutz where she became an anti-Zionist and a revolutionary socialist and met Yigael Gluckstein (better known as Tony Cliff). After the war, she moved to Britain where she was a member of the Revolutionary Communist Party from 1944 to 1949; afterwards joining the group which eventually became the Socialist Workers Party. She was active in many anti-racist and anti-fascist mobilisations. She worked as a teacher and was active in the National Union of Teachers in Hackney. She was also an artist whose sculpture has been exhibited in the Royal Academy of Arts.

== Selected writings ==
- Education and Society: A rank-and-file pamphlet (1968)
- Education and Revolution: a great experiment in socialist education (1972)
- Class Size and the Relationship Between Official and Unofficial Action in the NUT (1977)
- Women and Perestroika (1989)
- Education under capitalism and socialism (1991)
- 1919: Britain on the Brink of Revolution (1995)
- Education: Why our children deserve better than New Labour (with Kevin Ovenden) (1999)
- Fighting Fit: A Memoir (includes an illustrated pamphlet on Malevich and Revolution) (2013)
