= Into Film =

UK film charity

- Founded: 2013
- Type: Registered charity
- Purpose: Education
- Location(s): London; Salford; Edinburgh; Cardiff; Belfast
- Region served: United Kingdom
- Key people: Fiona Evans (CEO)
- Website: www.intofilm.org

Into Film is a charity supported principally by the British Film Institute (through the National Lottery), Cinema First and Northern Ireland Screen. Into Film aims to put film at the heart of children and young people's educational, cultural and personal development.

More than half of UK schools engage with Into Film's programme of Into Film Clubs, special cinema screenings, educational resources and training to support classroom teaching. Into Film aims to provide 5- to 19-year-olds with opportunities to learn about and with film and develop a passion for cinema.

Into Film runs two flagship annual events: The Into Film Festival, which enables more than 400,000 children and young people to access the cinema for free, and the Into Film Awards, which celebrates the filmmaking and learning achievements of pupils and educators from across the UK.

Into Film also engages in ongoing educational research, including live action-research projects in schools, to provide evidence of the impact on pupil engagement and attainment when teaching and learning with film.

== History ==
Into Film was founded in 2013 as the result of a merger between two charities – Film Club and First Light. Paul Reeve MBE remained the CEO of Into Film until April 2024, when Fiona Evans was appointed as his successor.

== Into Film Programme ==
=== Into Film+ ===
In June 2021, Into Film launched Into Film+, the UK's first streaming platform dedicated to film and designed for all school settings, created in partnership with Filmbankmedia, who are Into Film's principal content, licensing and streaming technology provider.

Into Film+ allows UK schools to safely stream a wide range of classic and new release films in the classroom and extra-curricular settings for free (provided they have the appropriate licence to do so). All films are digitally secured and will only play in the user's licensed location.

Launching with 150+ titles, the new platform offers extensive resources for teachers of all age groups and subject areas, and was developed to support learning outcomes for pupils aged 5–19. Each film is paired with educational resources, with many also featuring exclusive bonus content such as director introductions and interviews with filmmakers.

=== Into Film Clubs ===
Into Film Club is an extra-curricular activity that enables educators to bring young people together and inspire a passion for film and film learning in young audiences. Clubs in school settings tend to be run by teachers, and usually take place after school or during break times, while some clubs are run in other settings, such as libraries and youth clubs.

Into Film Clubs seek to offer a safe and inclusive environment for UK children and young people to develop skills and explore their love of film. Club members are encouraged to develop literacy skills by writing reviews of the films they have seen, while thousands of educators use Into Film Clubs to reinforce curricular learning, develop transferable skills and increase pupil motivation.

=== Resources ===
Into Film has developed thousands of educational resources that utilise the medium of film to support curriculum learning. Into Film resources feature relevant film content embedded directly into ready-to-use downloadable PowerPoints with teachers' notes.

Into Film also work with film distributors to develop resources in support of new cinema releases to create a wide range of unique educational experiences. Into Film's Wonder Park partnership with Paramount Pictures reached the shortlist for The Screen Awards Brand Partnership of the Year 2019.

Into Film's resources also seek to support pupil wellbeing and schools to use film as an effective tool for exploring potentially sensitive topics, as represented through resources around anti-bullying, mental wellbeing and staying safe online.

=== Training ===
Into Film offer Professional development training to educators. Training is created with input from specialist partners, including teachers and senior school leaders across the UK, to support teachers in using film as a tool for learning across the curriculum.

As a result of the successful conclusion of a Paul Hamlyn Foundation-supported Full STEAM Ahead project, Into Film was awarded a further four-year grant for Film for Learning (FFL), an initiative designed to improve pupils' literacy and develop teachers as film club leaders within their schools.

Into Film also launched a teacher development programme for members of the National Education Union, which piloted blended learning with face-to-face sessions supported by Into Film's online training platform.

== Into Film Festival ==
The annual Into Film Festival is the largest free youth film festival in the world, and delivers thousands of free events and screenings, in partnership with industry distributors and exhibitors.

According to Into Film, over 2.5 million pupils and teachers across the UK have been to the cinema for no cost as part of the Festival since the first edition in 2013. The Festival programme includes specialist films and exclusive previews of upcoming blockbusters, as well as inclusive SEN and autism-friendly screenings.

The Festival also provides opportunities for audience members to interact with film industry talent, with many events featuring Q&A sessions with actors, directors and other filmmaking professionals.

Opening films at the Festival in recent years have included exclusive previews of 2040, The Grinch, He Named Me Malala and Paddington 2, while closing films have included previews of Coco, Frozen II and Ralph Breaks the Internet.

== Into Film Awards ==
The Into Film Awards is an annual celebration of the filmmaking and learning achievements of pupils and educators from across the UK. Categories are designed to highlight the large pool of young creatives in the UK, with hundreds of films being submitted each year, as well as honouring notable Into Film Clubs and educators.

A red-carpet Awards ceremony is held each year in London, with nominated young people and Into Film Clubs from across the UK invited to attend. The Into Film Awards has taken place at the prestigious ODEON Leicester Square cinema and the BFI Southbank. Awards are presented by a range of film industry talent, with previous guests including Eddie Redmayne, Daniel Craig, Lily James, Amma Asante and Martin Freeman.

== Trustees ==
Into Film's trustees consist of many leading figures from the film industry. Eric Fellner acts as Into Film's Chair.

- Eric Fellner
- Barbara Broccoli
- Col Needham
- Lisa Bryer
- John Graydon
- Nira Park
- Anne Mensah
- Gráinne McKenna
- Danielle Lewis-Egonu
- Lisa Williams

== Ambassadors ==
Into Film's work is supported and championed by both prominent and up-and-coming figures in the film industry.

- Eddie Redmayne
- Lashana Lynch
- Jack Lowden
- Thaddea Graham
- Lynwen Brennan
- Katie Leung
- Michael Sheen
- Ruby Barnhill
- Matthew Rhys
- Naomie Harris
- Sir Kenneth Branagh
- Rhys Ifans
- Cornelius Walker
- Celyn Jones
