= Geest (disambiguation) =

Geest is a type of sandy heathland common in northern Europe, especially in North Germany, Denmark and the Netherlands.

Geest may also refer to:

== People ==
- Dennis van der Geest (born 1975), Dutch judoka
- Elco van der Geest (born 1979), Dutch-born Belgian judoka
- Frank van der Geest (born 1973), Dutch football goalkeeper
- Wybrand de Geest (1592–1661), Dutch painter
- Jack van der Geest (1923–2009), escaped WWII Resistance member
- Gerrit De Geest (born 1960), Belgian scholar
- Willy De Geest (born 1947), Belgian cyclist

== Other uses ==
- Geest (brand), a British banana import and food manufacturing company

== See also ==
- Geeste (disambiguation)
