= Meindert =

Meindert is a Dutch given name. Notable people with the name include:

- Meindert De Jong (1904–1991), American children's book author
- Meindert Dijkstra (born 1967), Dutch footballer
- Meindert Fennema (1946–2023), Dutch political scientist
- Meindert Hobbema (c. 1638–1709), Dutch painter
- Meindert Klem (born 1987), Dutch Olympian rower
- Meindert Leerling (1936–2021), Dutch politician
- Meindert Talma (born 1968), Dutch musician
- Meindert van Buuren (born 1995), Dutch racing driver
- Meindert van Ham (c. 1470 – after 1545), German mercenary commander
- Meindert Wiardi Beckman (1795–1893), Dutch politician
- Pieter Meindert Schreuder (1912–1945), Dutch anti-Nazi resistance member
