= Gerrit Kastein =

Dutch neurologist (1910–1943)

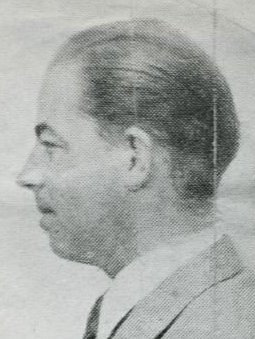
G.W. Kastein

Gerrit Willem Kastein (25 June 1910 – 21 February 1943) was a Dutch communist, neurologist and resistance fighter and leader during World War II.

== Early life ==
Kastein was born in Zutphen, the eldest son of Albertus Gerhardus Kastein and Gerdina Leurink. He studied medicine specializing in neurology and submitted his dissertation at the Rijksuniversiteit Leiden in 1937. He married and had two children. During the 1930s Kastein became an ardent communist and often gave lectures. For that reason he was watched by the Dutch authorities. During the Spanish Civil War, he participated as a general doctor, who along with a Dutch ambulance team provided assistance. On returning to the Netherlands, he later provided medical assistance to fellow communist Arie Kloostra during a riot in The Hague, whom he would later join in the Dutch resistance. Kastein was strongly against racism, and wrote a book on the subject.

== World War II ==
Immediately after the Dutch capitulation, Kastein joined the Dutch resistance. On 17 May 1940 he attended the inaugural meeting of The Hague branch of the illegal CPN, at the home of Toon van der Kroft. During the meeting, the Spark Group was founded. Kastein was also one of the initiators of the medical Resistance. Kastein's sympathies and activities came under suspicion, and the first attempt to arrest him was on 2 September 1941. But forewarned, he went into hiding. Kastein formed the communist Dutch resistance group CS-6, named after their address Corellistraat 6 in Amsterdam, where the two brothers Boissevain lived. The members were: Jan Verleun; Pam Pooters; Reina Prinsen Geerligs; Leo Frijda; Hans Katan; Sape Kuipers; the brothers Jan Charles Boissevain and Gideon William Boissevain; their cousin Louis Boissevain. Kastein also chose to work closely with non-communist resistance groups. He gathered extensive pictures of German coastal defences along the Dutch coast, and planned to send them to the Dutch government-in-exile in London via a neutral Swedish ship via Gothenburg. He was provided with a contact in the form of Anton van der Waals, who was a double agent for the Sicherheitsdienst. This meant that the Germans gained a copy of the film, which was altered before being forwarded via Kees Dutilh.

=== Gemachtigden van den Leider ===
After Hitler had approved Anton Mussert as "Leider van het Nederlandse Volk" (Leader of the Dutch People) in December 1942, he was allowed to form a national government institute, a Dutch shadow cabinet called "Gemachtigden van den Leider", which advised Reichskommissar Arthur Seyss-Inquart from 1 February 1943. The institute consisted of a number of deputies in charge of defined functions or departments within the administration. On 4 February retired General and Rijkscommissaris Hendrik Seyffardt, already head of the Dutch SS volunteer group Vrijwilligerslegioen Nederland, was announced through the press as "Deputy for Special Services". As a result, CS-6 concluded that the new institute would eventually lead to a National Socialist government, which would then introduce general conscription to enable the call-up of Dutch nationals for the Eastern Front. The Nazis only saw Mussert and the NSB as a useful Dutch tool to enable general cooperation. Seyss-Inquart had assured Mussert after his December 1942 meeting with Hitler that general conscription was not on the agenda. CS-6 assessed that Seyffardt was the first person within the new institute eligible for an attack, after Mussert. Approval was granted from the Dutch government-in-exile.

On the evening of Friday, 5 February 1943, Seyffardt answered a knock at his front door in Scheveningen, The Hague, and was shot twice by student Jan Verleun, who had accompanied Kastein on the mission. In the later Nazi lawsuit against Verleun, he declared that he was accompanied by Kastein, while other sources suggest that Leo Frijda accompanied him in the attack and that Kastein was only present during preparation. A day later Seyffardt succumbed to his injuries in hospital. A private military ceremony at the Binnenhof was attended by family and friends, with Mussert in attendance, after which Seyffardt was cremated. On 7 February, CS-6 shot fellow institute member Gemachtigde voor de Volksvoorlichting (Attorney for national relations) Hermannus Reydon and his wife. The latter died on the spot, while Reydon died on 24 August of his injuries. The gun used in this attack had been given to Kastein by SD agent Anton van der Waals and was used to track Kastein.

=== Operation Silbertanne ===
Seyffardt and Reydon's deaths led to many German reprisals in the occupied Netherlands, under Operation Silbertanne. SS General Hanns Albin Rauter immediately ordered the murder of 50 Dutch hostages and raids on Dutch universities. Later, on 6 March 1945, the Dutch resistance accidentally attacked Rauter's car, leading the Nazis to round up 117 men at the De Woeste Hoeve; they were executed at the site of the ambush. Another 147 Gestapo prisoners were executed elsewhere. On 1–2 October 1944, 661 men in the village of Putten were rounded up; thirteen escaped and 58 were sent back, but the remaining 590 were deported to camps to be killed in retaliation for resistance activity in the Putten raid.

== Arrest and death ==
On 19 February 1943, Kastein was scheduled to meet fellow CS-6 member Piet Wapperom in De Kroon public house, Delft. However, Wapperom had been arrested by the SD Rotterdam in Utrecht, where a subsequent search of his rooms found a notebook with details of the meeting. Compromised, Wapperom agreed to co-operate, but the SD also tied a broomstick down his trousers to ensure that he could not escape. After entering the public house as agreed at 10:00, Kastein was arrested. Taken to a waiting car, he was placed in the back with Ernst Knorr of The Hague SD. A struggle ensued, in which Kastein managed to shoot and seriously wound Knorr. A subsequent search of Kastein at the local SD offices found a notebook scheduling a second meeting that day with fellow Dutch resistance member "Luc" at a cafe near the Binnenhof. Kastein was forced to cooperate, with the meeting scheduled to take place at a coffee shop in Voorburg, The Hague.

Taken there in a car by SD agent John Hoffman, a struggle ensued during the journey where by Kastein shot SD agent and driver Martin Kohlen in the leg. Kastein then tried to make an escape, but was quickly recaptured despite a rescue attempt by four resistance members who came out of the cafe. On the return journey to the Binnenhof, Kastein tried to retrieve a hidden weapon from his body, but it bounced out and was taken by the SD agents. Left alone in an interrogation room while tied to a chair, he jumped through a closed second floor window. On landing he fractured his skull and died a few hours later. A colleague of Kastein from another hospital and the wife of another colleague attended him and were witnesses to his injuries and death. After the war, it emerged that Luc was in fact a pseudonym for Anton van der Waals. It was hence interpreted that Kastein had recognised Van der Waals as a double agent, and had set up the meeting to interrogate the traitor.

== Aftermath ==
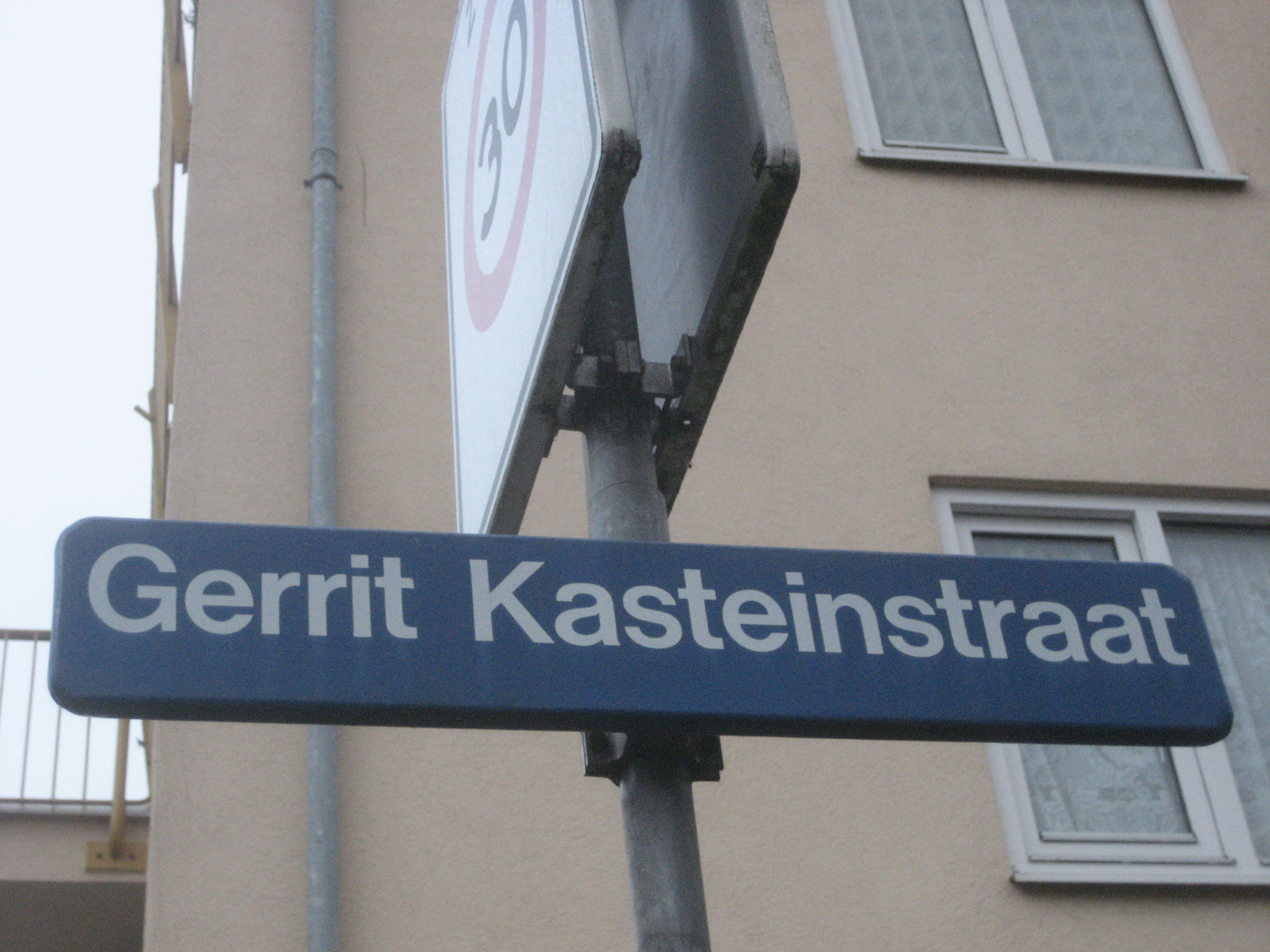
Street sign in Leiden

Dr. Gerrit Willem Kastein was posthumously awarded the Dutch Cross of Resistance. He is buried in the National Cemetery of Honours in Loenen.
