= Oege Gerhardus de Boer =

Dutch politician (1922–2021)

Mayor of Schiermonnikoog
- In office 1957–1964

Mayor of Norg
- In office 1964–1985

Personal details
- Born: 1 January 1922 Vierhuizen, Netherlands
- Died: 24 March 2021 (aged 99) Norg, Netherlands
- Party: Initially independent, later VVD

Oege Gerhardus de Boer (1 January 1922 – 24 March 2021) was a Dutch mayor and civil servant.

== Career ==
De Boer attended the MULO (Meer uitgebreid lager onderwijs) in Ulrum and subsequently began a career in civil service, working in several municipalities including Ulrum, Aduard, Eenrum, Hoogwoud, and Hoorn. In 1955 he became the municipal tax collector of Schiermonnikoog, where he later served as mayor from 1957 to 1964. He was also the municipal secretary of Schiermonnikoog during his tenure.

In 1964, De Boer was appointed mayor of Norg, a position he held until 1985. Under his leadership, it was decided that the construction of a multifunctional centre, De Brinkhof, would be preferred over separate facilities for different village services.

During the Second World War, De Boer played an active role in the Dutch resistance. He was imprisoned in the infamous Scholtenshuis in Groningen. Politically, he was initially unaffiliated, but during his mayorship in Norg he became a member of the VVD. In 1985, De Boer chose to take early retirement from his mayoral post.

== Personal life ==
De Boer was born in Vierhuizen, Groningen, as the son of machinist Durk Klaas de Boer and Aaltje Markus. De Boer passed away in Norg in 2021 at the age of 99.
