= Pieter Meindert Schreuder =

Dutch resistance member

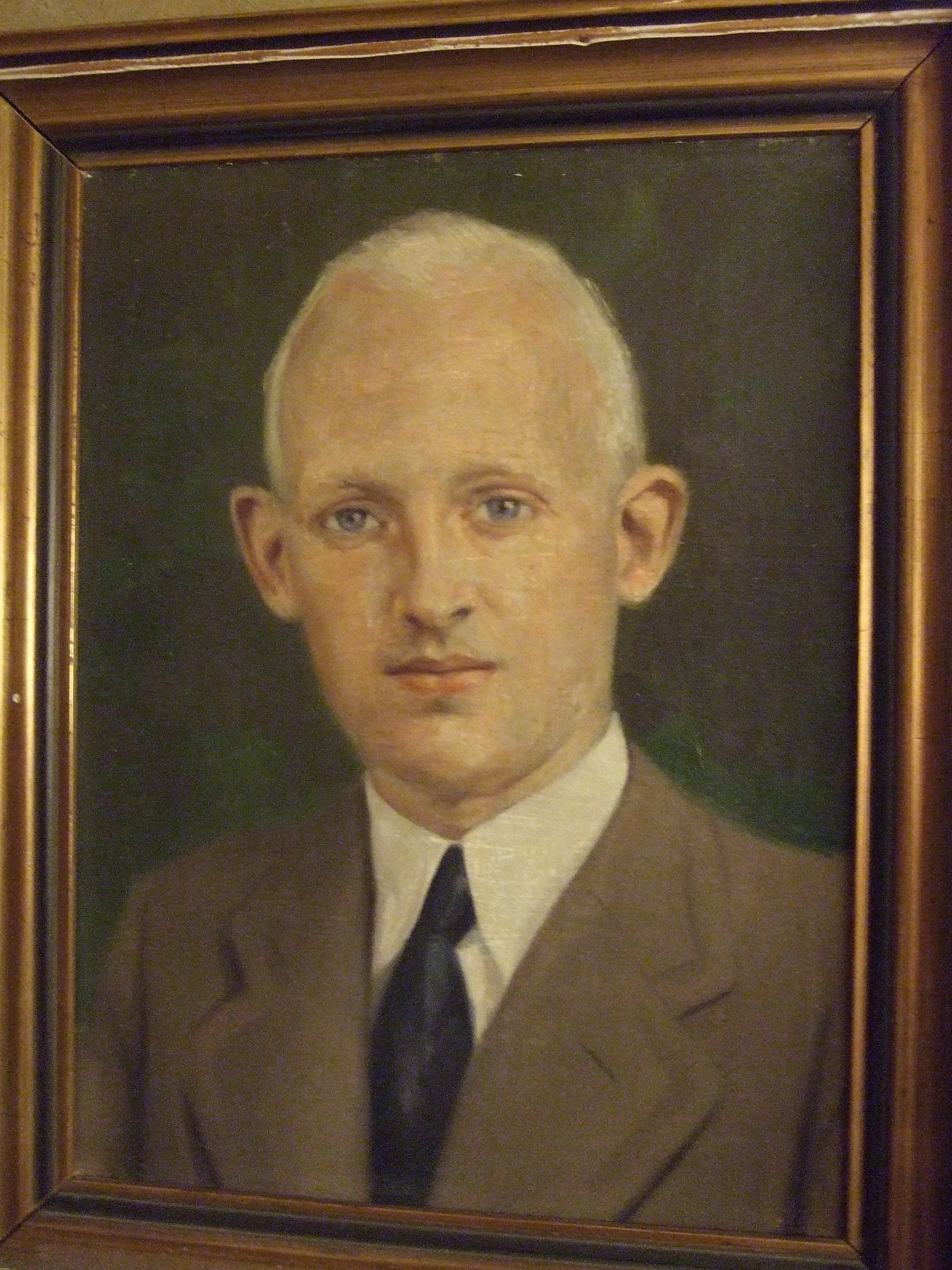
Schreuder's Portrait

Pieter Meindert Schreuder (17 October 1912 – 8 April 1945) was a Dutch resistance leader in the occupied Netherlands during the Second World War.

== Biography ==
Schreuder was born in Groningen, Netherlands. He was a sergeant in the Dutch army and later an owner of a drycleaning business, and joined the resistance movement after the German occupation in May 1940. In 1944/45 he was "chief of staff" of the Northern section of the Ordedienst (O.D.), a resistance group. The O.D. had ties with the Dutch government, at that time in exile in London, and was involved in spying, sabotage, theft and assassinations. Betrayal from within the group led to Schreuder's arrest on 7 February 1945. He was imprisoned in the infamous "Scholtenhuis" in Groningen, the headquarters of the Sicherheitsdienst (S.D., a branch of the SS), where he was tortured and eventually shot and died in Anloo, Netherlands at the age of 32.

== Honors ==
Dwight Eisenhower (as Supreme Commander of SHAEF) commended Schreuder posthumously for "brave conduct while acting under his orders during the liberation of the country".

On 15 December 1983 Schreuder was posthumously awarded the Resistance Memorial Cross, presented by Prince Bernhard of Lippe-Biesterfeld to his widow.
