= Middendorp (surname) =

Middendorp is a surname. Notable people with the surname include:

- Ernst Middendorp (born 1958), German football manager
- Geertruida Middendorp (1911–2007), Dutch Resistance member
- Jakob Middendorp (c. 1537–1611), Dutch Catholic theologian and churchman
- Tom Middendorp (born 1960), Dutch four-star general

i
