= Gerard Reeskamp =

Dutch resistance fighter (1899–1970)

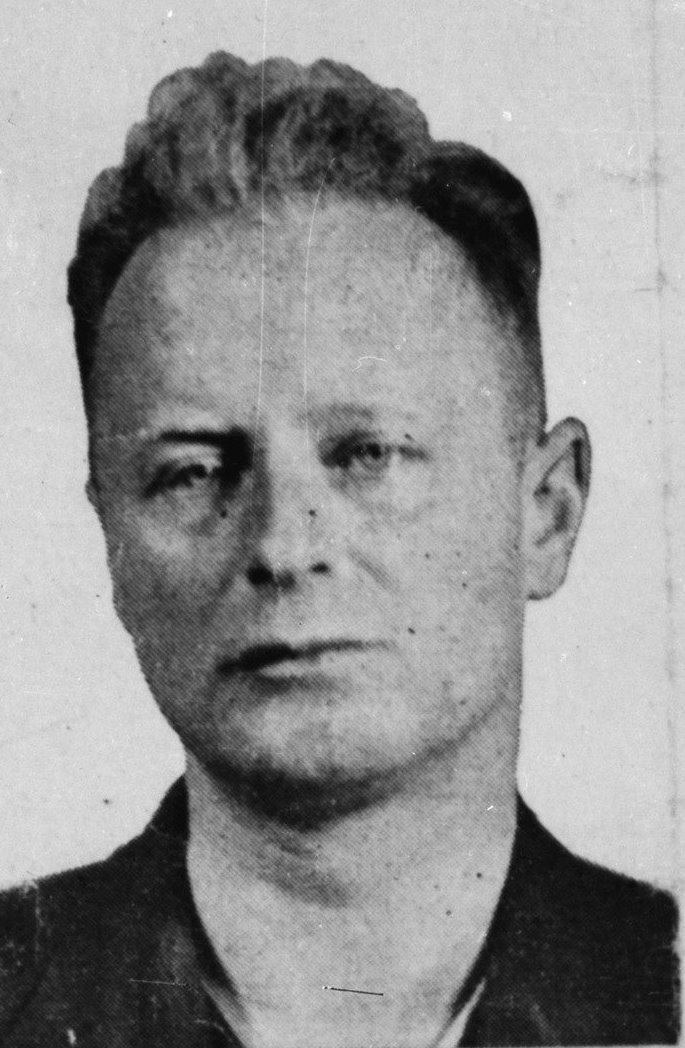
- Born: August 13, 1899; Utrecht
- Died: March 26, 1970 (aged 70); Soest
- Military career
- Allegiance: Dutch resistance
- Unit: Binnenlandse Strijdkrachten
- Conflicts: World War II

Gerard Adrianus Reeskamp (Utrecht, 13 August 1899 – Soest, 26 March 1970) was a Dutch resistance fighter who was active in Friesland and the Gooi during World War II.

== Before the war ==
Gerard Reeskamp was born in 1899 in Utrecht. He started a successful drugstore in Bussum. In 1933, Reeskamp and his large family moved from their home above the drugstore to a detached house in Naarden. A devout Protestant, his faith was important to him throughout his life.

== Resistance ==
Before the war (1939) he was practically already part of the resistance, tailing Germany-sympathizers in the area together with his eldest son, Gerard Reeskamp. Reeskamp already distributed pamphlets before the war to warn people of the imminent danger. Immediately after the invasion in May 1940, he organized a resistance group in the Gooi, nearby Amsterdam. His eldest son Gerard together with the later famous resistance fighter Theo Dobbe were members of this group. The group stole chests of ammunition and trotyl from the fortifications at Naarden, which were later used by Dobbe for bombings in Amsterdam. Several months later, the group was betrayed and arrested, but father and son Reeskamp managed to escape. As he was wanted by the Sicherheitsdienst (SD), Reeskamp was forced to leave his family and drugstore in Naarden behind in 1940, and seek refuge in Sneek, the birthplace of his wife Sjoukje. He came into contact with Sybrand Marinus van Haersma Buma, the mayor of Wymbritseradeel. Through his contacts, Reeskamp was able to foment resistance in the province of Friesland. In the area of Sneek (Scharnegoutum) he founded one of the first Frisian 'knokploegen' (fighting squads). He was asked to help during large operations elsewhere in the province, most notably during the assault on the Leeuwarden prison. Because of his resistance activities, the Germans wrote him down for several death sentences. A bounty of 10.000 guilders was put on his head, whether dead or alive. In 1944, Reeskamp was appointed District Operation Leader of the sabotage teams in southwestern Friesland. In his resistance, Gerard Reeskamp was supported by his wife Sjoukje Reeskamp-Wielinga. In 1943, she was held in captivity together with her children for several months and was interrogated, but she did not give away her husband's whereabouts. In 1943, Sjoukje took two Jewish children into her home. For this, she received the Yad Vashem award in 1988, requested by her Hidden Children.

== Overview of resistance activities ==
=== Propaganda activities ===
- from his drugstore, flyers were distributed which warned the people of the dangers of the German occupation (1939) and which were intended to increase the moral resilience of his compatriots
- he raised money to print propaganda reading material such as Vrij Nederland and De Oranjekrant. These were subsequently brought to the existing resistance groups by him personally (1941). These activities were an important reason for the SD to hunt him down

=== Paramilitary activities ===
- he stole chests of ammunition and trotyl from the guarded arms deposits in the fortified garrison at Naarden (June 1940)
- he made incendiary bombs out of phosphorus and gunpowder, with which the ammunition deposits in Soesterberg were destroyed (1940)
- shortly before he was transported to Kamp Amersfoort, he managed to escape from the guarded Binnengasthuis in Amsterdam (December 1942)
- he took charge of the cover squad during the successful raid on the Leeuwarden Penitentiary Facility; 52 resistance members were freed during the raid (8 December 1944)
- he took charge during two raids on the Sneek police station, during which 20 resistance members were freed
- as a commander, he organized reception and transport of airdrops with weapons in southwest Friesland (1944-1945)
- he bombed a train transporting ammunition in Bozum (December 1944)
- he disarmed the German soldiers at gunpoint, on the day Sneek was liberated (15 April 1945)

=== Helped construct resistance in Friesland ===
- helped construct reading groups in the whole of Friesland, which often developed into resistance groups later on.

=== Activities regarding refugees and other victims ===
- he raided distribution offices in Wommels (23 Oct. 1942), Bolsward, Rauwerd and Mantgum for ration coupons and identification cards
- in Bolsward, he destroyed the address list containing potential candidates for forced labour in Germany
- he raided the population register in Rauwerd for blank identity cards
- he raided ten cheese factories in Friesland
- he shipped food supplies to Amsterdam. Agent Akkerman testified to no less than 200 food aid packages, which had arrived during the Dutch famine of 1944
- he robbed dozens of livestock traders who did not want to donate money to the resistance and the refugees

== After the liberation ==
Immediately after the war, Reeskamp was lauded for his courage and boundless effort. He received a recommendation by general Dwight D. Eisenhower on behalf of the Allied Expeditionary Force, for the courage he had displayed. But the last robbery of a livestock trader on 16 January 1945 proved fatal. Reeskamp, who had joined the resistance organization Binnenlandse Strijdkrachten ('Internal Forces') by the end of 1944, robbed livestock traders at the request of Haitze Wiersma, commander of the Frisian branch of the National Organization for Aiding Refugees, in order to finance the resistance, which was constantly plagued by money troubles. Money was direly needed to feed the refugees. During his assignment, two members of his group made a failed robbery-attempt on a rich livestock trader. When he resisted, one of the group members panicked and shot the trader in the head with the pistol he had lent from Reeskamp. The livestock trader was left behind in the snow, and died of pneumonia a few weeks later. Detective Aukema found one of the bullets and held on to it for one and a half years. As Ad van Liempt indicates in his book 'De Drogist', Aukema jr. was a police officer who collaborated with the Germans during the war. According to Van Liempt, this was no coincidence since his father was one of the most notorious Jew-hunters in Amsterdam. For one and a half years Aukema jr. was suspended, awaiting his reprimand. After his suspension was over in 1947, he fanatically committed himself to prosecuting his old wartime enemy Gerard Reeskamp. The bullet he had kept for so long turned out to be crucial for his purposes.

== Trial ==
Reeskamp was tried as a soldier for his part in the death of the rich livestock trader, since he had joined the Binnenlandse Strijdkrachten by the end of 1944, which was later incorporated into the military regime. It would cost him dearly. The passionate hearing officer C.H. Beekhuis, active during the war as a lawyer in Leeuwarden, after an initial sentence of 2 years imprisonment, appealed and demanded 6 years imprisonment. 'De Drogist' states that according to Beekhuis, who was completely unaware of any resistance work, the resistance was to have an unblemished record in history. The Supreme Military Court sentenced Reeskamp to 4 years in prison. It was not taken into account that the purpose of that fatal robbery in the war was aiding the refugees. It was not the only remarkable legal aspect of this case. Only after 7 months of imprisonment a lawyer was assigned to Reeskamp. During the trials, his lawyer made little effort in his defense. Witnesses for his defense were not summoned.

== In culture ==
Ad van Liempt wrote in his book 'De Drogist' that he did not intend to rehabilitate Reeskamp, but that he did attempt to unearth the truth and that he attempted to ascertain to the best of his abilities what Reeskamp had done in the war and what had happened to him afterwards. Many readers have stated on the biographical website that they cannot help seeing the book as a reparation for a courageous and successful resistance fighter.

A play about his life was created and staged in 2020.

== A remarkable resistance fighter ==
Various aspects give Reeskamp a special place in the Dutch resistance history. First of all, his anti-NSB activities before the war (1939) are a testament to his foresight, while his resistance activities during May 1940 are proof of his strong vigor. He was one of the first resistance fighters in the Netherlands, Loe de Jong writes in his multivolume work on World War II. In a letter, De Jong calls Reeskamp one of the first and more important resistance fighters of the Netherlands. A second remarkable aspect of Reeskamp his nature is that he performed his resistance activities as humanely as possible, always attempting to minimize civilian casualties, as the book 'De Drogist' also indicates. The multiple propaganda actions he made to strengthen the moral resilience of his compatriots also stand out. As for the post-war chapter of his story, the first question which comes to mind is why it was possible for the Leeuwarden legal system and police to dispose themselves so easily of an outlaw who had evaded the Germans successfully for years. He is the only resistance fighter who was sentenced and imprisoned after the war for an act of resistance other than assassination. The many hundreds of assassinations carried out by the resistance, even those committed after the war was over, have never led to prosecution.
