= Geertruida Middendorp =

Geertruida Elisabeth Middendorp (November 21, 1911 – July 13, 2007) was a member of the World War II Dutch resistance group National Organization for Helping People in Hiding (Landelijke Organisatie voor Hulp aan Onderduikers, LO). The LO made counterfeit food ration coupons;and obtained authentic coupons from loyal Netherlands citizens in the employ of the Dutch Nazis. Other groups conducted raids and robberies to steal authentic coupons from government agencies. And some Dutch civilians gave up their own coupons to the LO during the second world war. She married Hendrik Middendorp (October 2, 1911 – July 13, 1989) in 1934.

== Activities during the War Years ==
When the German army invaded the Netherlands, Middendorp worked for the De Telegraaf newspaper. When Middendorp became active in the Dutch underground, this would have given her the opportunity to distribute any underground newspapers (especially as their telephone lines had been destroyed by the advancing Germans, and the use of radio transmitters was too dangerous because of German direction-finding operations. These newspapers helped counterbalance Nazi propaganda and the German-controlled media. However, De Telegraaf was transferred and/or controlled in this time of the SS. The illegal press flourished in the Netherlands during the German Occupation of 1940–1945. Titles are known of almost thirteen hundred illegal papers and leaflets. Some only appeared for a short time, while others were issued throughout the five years of the occupation. A few were handwritten, but most were duplicated, and some were actually printed. The majority of the illegal papers appeared in print runs of a few hundred, but some achieved a circulation in the tens of thousands.

Middendorp was active in supplying and hiding Jewish refugees supplying food coupons whenever possible: They had rescued many Jews from certain death at the hands of the Nazi SS.

In 1943, food coupons were introduced. You'd get a stamp book and each coupon would say, "Good for two ounces of butter, one loaf of bread," or whatever. The bread was just like an accordion. You could pull it way out or squeeze it tightly together. (This is called "balloon bread" in America.) The coupons were color-coded. For example, milk was yellow, bread was red, and so on. Middendorp as did her sister began taking in refugees, some of whom were Jews, others members of the resistance movement sought by the Gestapo and its Dutch counterpart, either in Middendorp's family home or at the Cafe Monopol Amstel in Amsterdam. During 1943, 1944, and 1945, when Dutch men walked outside into the streets, they were often captured, not just by Germans, but also by people who were authorized to find them. Once captured, they would be put into trucks and they would be gone! Every time a man showed his face on the street, he could be captured by anyone because we didn't know who was "pro" or "anti." Often the men managed to escape and return home, just to be captured again.

'During the occupation, Hendrick was sent to Germany as forced labour to work in the BMW factory, he was able to get back to Holland, he became a fugitive, he stayed with Middendorp's sister in the Cafe Monopole Amstel in Amsterdam later he was able to acquire a pass and was given work in the community kitchen in Amsterdam.

The mandatory wearing of the yellow star, which went into effect in late April, 1940, infuriated the Middendorp family as did informers and collaborators. Many gentiles did try to show their sympathy. The underground newspaper, De Vonk printed 300,000 paper stars with inscription, "Jews and Non-Jews are ones." 23 students at one school were sent for two weeks to Amersfoort concentration camp for wearing such stars. The wearing of the yellow star now made it ever so much easier to identify Jews once the roundups would begin. Knowing this aspect, Middendorp chose to change her own coat to help save a Jew, which some say was very foolish, but, you had to know and meet Geertruida and Hendrick Middendorp to understand why.

By mid-1944, Middendorp took her two sons over the IJsselmeer by a barge to Friesland to a farm, one to keep the boys safe and the second reason was the coupons she could use to feed the refugees. The western Netherlands was where the Canadian Armed Forces comprising the 1st Canadian Infantry division and the 5th Canadian Armoured Divisions, under the command of Lieut.-General Charles Foulkes, was responsible for the liberation of the area north of the Meuse (Maas).

In this region with its large cities of Amsterdam, Rotterdam and The Hague, the people had almost reached the end of their endurance from the misery and starvation which had accompanied the "Hunger Winter". Food supplies in the cities were exhausted, fuel had run out almost entirely and the transport was virtually non-existent. Thousands of men, women and children had perished.

Middendorp remembered the actual day the war ended. She remembered when Americans started flying over, very low, dropping crates of canned goods, sometimes in fields, sometimes in streets, but without parachutes. They just dropped them. And the English prepared special low-fat, high-nutrition cookies for us.

== Reflections On War ==
It seems to me that the most lasting impressions in life are those you receive as a young adult, they stick with you, and strange as it was, the older she got, the closer she felt to the war years. So, in general, the war is still always with you. It was embedded deep within and it will stay that way forever:

== Sources ==
- Stewart Bentley, The Dutch Resistance and the OSS: Of Market-Garden and Melanie, Central Intelligence Agency
- (broken link June 3, 2008)
