= Hendrik Seyffardt =

Dutch general (1872–1943)

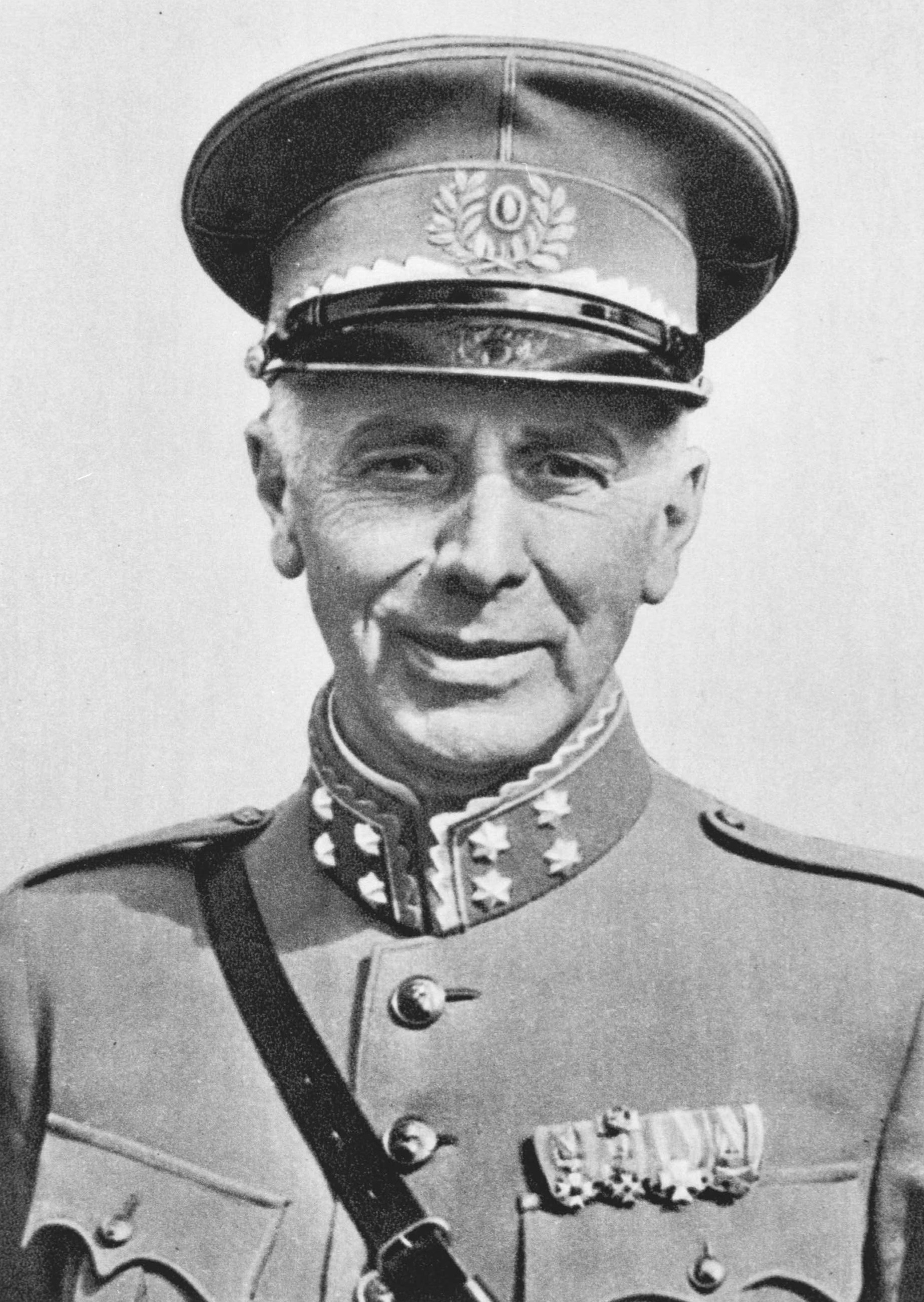
- Hendrik Seyffardt
- Born: 1 November 1872; Breda, Netherlands
- Died: 6 February 1943 (aged 70); Scheveningen, The Hague, Netherlands
- Relatives: August Lodewijk Willem Seyffardt (Father); Catharina Louisa de Hollander (Mother)
- Military career
- Allegiance: Royal Netherlands Army; Vrijwilligers Legioen Nederland
- Service years: 1887–1934; 1941–1943
- Rank: General
- Commands: Dutch SS Volunteer Legion

Hendrik Alexander Seyffardt (1 November 1872 – 6 February 1943) was a Dutch general who during World War II collaborated with Nazi Germany during the occupation of the Netherlands, most notably as a figurehead of the Volunteer Legion Netherlands, a unit of the Waffen-SS on the Eastern Front. He was assassinated by the Dutch resistance in 1943.

== Early life ==
Seijffardt was the son of August Lodewijk Willem Seyffardt, Minister of War in the Cabinet of Prime Minister Gijsbert van Tienhoven, and his wife Catharina Louisa de Hollander. Like his father, he chose a career as a professional soldier, and so at the age of fifteen he became a cadet at the Koninklijke Militaire Academie (KMA) in Breda. On graduation he was appointed second lieutenant at the Vestingartillerie (garrison artillery) in the Royal Netherlands Army, but returned to the KMA as a lecturer in 1900 at the age of 28. Alongside his teaching he studied at the Hogere Krijgsschool in Haarlem to become qualified for a position within the General Staff. In 1928, as an interim step, he was appointed commander of the first division in the rank of Major General. A year later he was appointed Chief of the General Staff, promoted to lieutenant general a year later, remaining as chief of the General Staff latterly attached to the Central Intelligence (CI), part of GS III. He retired in May 1934, after a very meritorious career.

== Nationalist sympathies ==
In the build-up to World War II, he began to give lectures for the conservative Alliance for National Reconstruction (Verbond voor Nationaal Herstel) led by Horace van Gybland Oosterhoff. In 1937, Seyffardt became a member of the National Socialist Movement in the Netherlands, and started writing articles for their publication Volk en Vaderland. But after a year and a half, disillusioned with the infighting between Anton Mussert and Meinoud Rost van Tonningen, he resigned his membership. In October 1940 he attended a meeting of a Fascist group organised around the magazine De Waag.

== Vrijwilligers Legioen Nederland ==
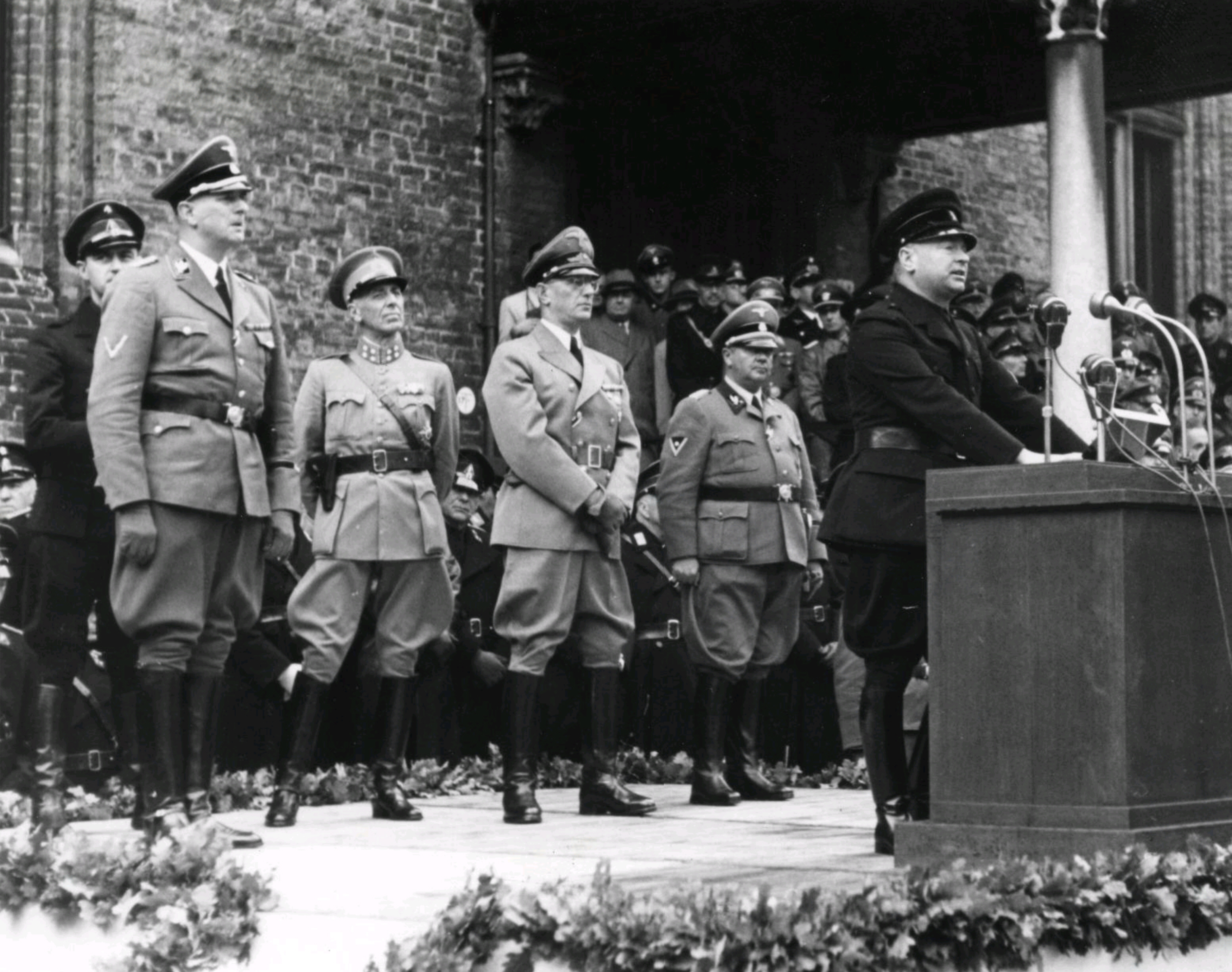
Leader Anton Mussert giving a speech to NSB volunteers in The Hague, October 1941. To the rear are Rijkscommissaris Arthur Seyss-Inquart, general Hendrik Seyffardt, SS Obergruppenführer Hanns Albin Rauter and Sicherheitsdienst-commander Wilhelm Harster.

On 28 June 1941, Arnold Meijer of the fascist Black Front made a proposal in Nederlandsch Dagblad, pleading for a joint establishment of a separate Dutch Legion that would take part in the fight against "Russian Bolshevism”. After internal opposition within the Dutch leadership, on 5 July 1941 Adolf Hitler officially approved the establishment of a Dutch volunteer SS group, and after being approached unofficially Seyffardt was officially appointed head of the Legion on 8 July by Reichskommissar Arthur Seyss-Inquart.

However, it must have been clear to the 69-year-old general from the start that he was but a figurehead, only in charge of the regional headquarters of the Volunteer Legion Netherlands, as the formation was named. This was solely responsible for enlisting recruits and for social assistance to the Legion soldiers and their families. R. Kleijn was appointed chief of staff to Seyffardt. The second unit formed was the 23rd SS Volunteer Panzer Grenadier Division Nederland in February 1941. After training in Hamburg and East Prussia, in November 1941 it was ordered to the Eastern Front near Leningrad, under the overall command of Army Group North. The division served alongside its Nazi German allies, suffering heavy losses. However, Seyffardt's input and contribution was systematically ignored by the German SS authorities. After rejoining the NSB, in March 1942 he submitted his resignation to Seyss-Inquart and SS Obergruppenführer Hanns Albin Rauter, but was persuaded to stay.

== Death ==
Personal flag of Hendrik Seyffardt, with the Wolfsangel symbol at centre

After Hitler had approved Anton Mussert as "Leider van het Nederlandse Volk" (Leader of the Dutch People) in December 1942, he was allowed to form a national government institute, a Dutch shadow cabinet called "Gemachtigden van den Leider", which would advise Arthur Seyss-Inquart from 1 February 1943. The institute would consist of a number of deputies in charge of defined functions or departments within the administration, and on 4 February Seyffardt was appointed "deputy for special services", announced through the press.

The Dutch communist resistance group CS-6 under Gerrit Kastein considered that the new institute would eventually lead to a National-Socialist government, which would then introduce general conscription to enable the call-up of Dutch nationals to the Eastern Front. CS-6 assessed that Seyffardt was the most suitable target for an attack in response, rather than the heavily protected Mussert. However, in reality, the Nazis only saw Mussert and the NSB as a useful Dutch tool to enable general co-operation, and Seyss-Inquart had further assured Mussert after his December 1942 meeting with Hitler that general conscription was not on the agenda.

After approval from the Dutch government in exile, on the evening of 5 February 1943, Seyffardt answered a knock at his front door in The Hague and was shot twice by student Jan Verleun, who had accompanied Kastein on the mission; Seyffardt died next day in hospital. A private military ceremony was arranged at the Binnenhof, The Hague, attended by family and friends and with Mussert in attendance, after which he was cremated. Verleun was executed on 7 January 1944. On 7 February, CS-6 shot institute member "Gemachtigde voor de Volksvoorlichting" (Attorney for the national relations) Hermannus Reydon and his wife. His wife died on the spot, and Reydon died of his wounds on 24 August. The gun used in this attack had been given to Kastein by an agent of the Nazi Sicherheitsdienst (SD), Van der Waals; and after tracking Kastein back through information, he was arrested on 19 February, and committed suicide two days later so as not to give away Dutch Resistance information under torture. Seyffardt and Reydon's deaths led to Operation Silbertanne, massive Nazi reprisal killings in the occupied Netherlands.

== Memorial ==
In Seyffardt's honour, the Germans renamed a unit of Dutch volunteers on the Eastern Front 48. Freiwilligen SS-Panzergrenadier-Regiment General Seyffardt.

== Stolen artwork ==
In 2026, a painting from the Jacques Goudstikker collection - Portrait of a Young Girl by Dutch artist Toon Kelder was found in the home of one of his descendants.
