= Bernardus IJzerdraat =

Dutch resistance fighter (1891–1941)

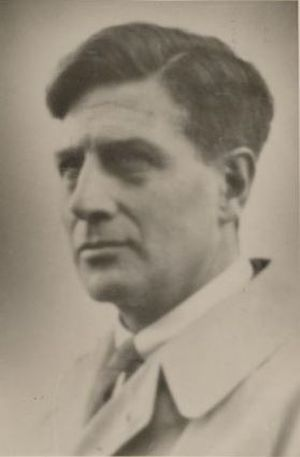
Bernard IJzerdraat

Bernardus IJzerdraat (1891 – 13 March 1941) was a Dutch resistance fighter in the Second World War.

A tapestry restorer from Rotterdam, he became involved as early as 1936 in the Eenheid door Democratie movement which opposed Fascism and Communism. Immediately after the bombing of Rotterdam during the German invasion in 1940, he set up the first Dutch resistance group, De Geuzen "The Beggars", and published the Geuzenbericht, a resistance pamphlet, on 15 May, the day after the bombing of Rotterdam.

He was arrested together with other members of his group when the Germans discovered a list of names and addresses at his home. After a show trial, he was shot at Scheveningen on 13 March 1941 together with 17 others, including three Communists involved in the February Strike.

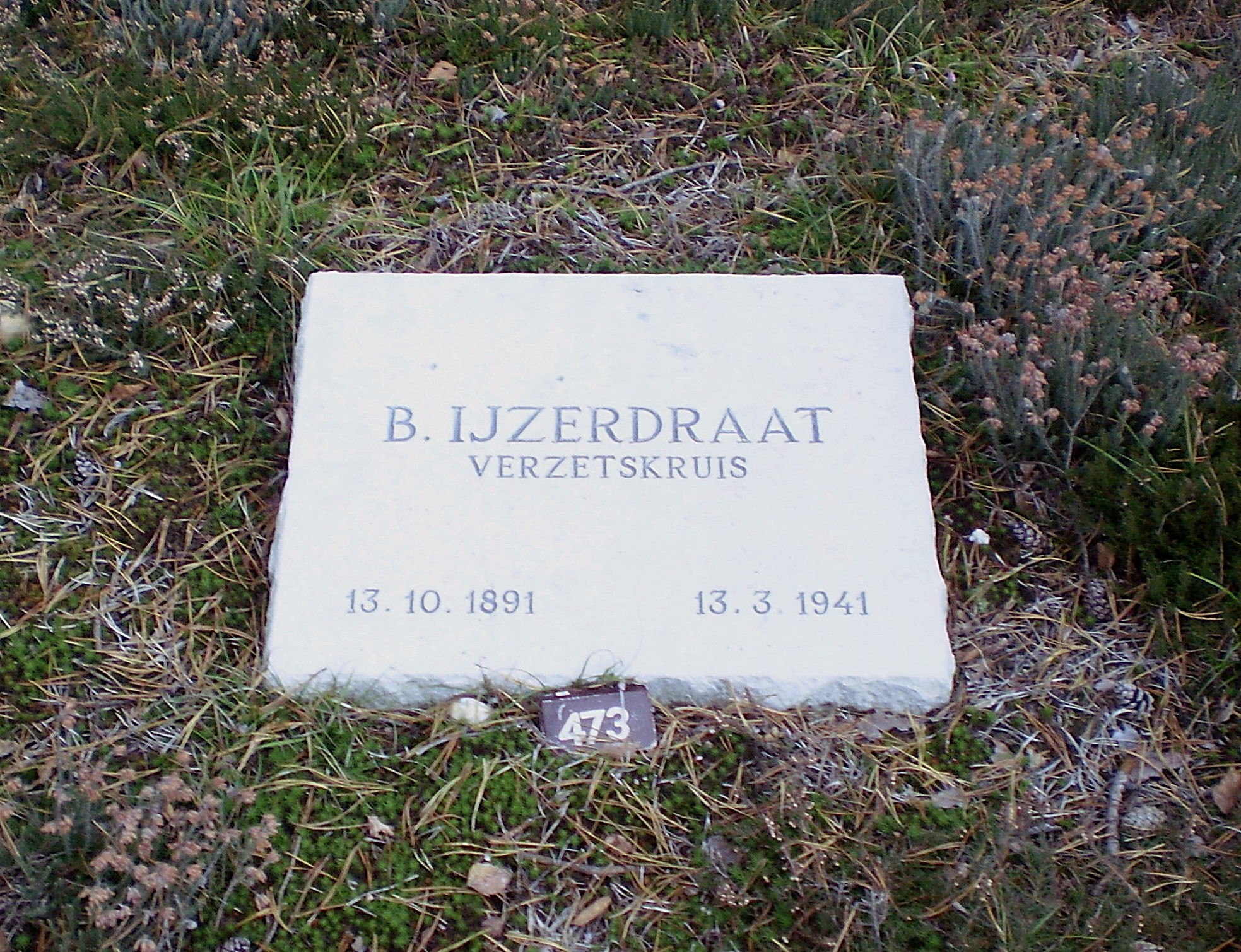
Bernard IJzerdraat's gravestone in Loenen Field of Honour

He was posthumously awarded the Resistance Cross which his widow received in 1955. IJzerdraat was buried at the National Cemetery of Honours in Loenen.
