= Dutch resistance =

WWII resistance to Nazi occupation

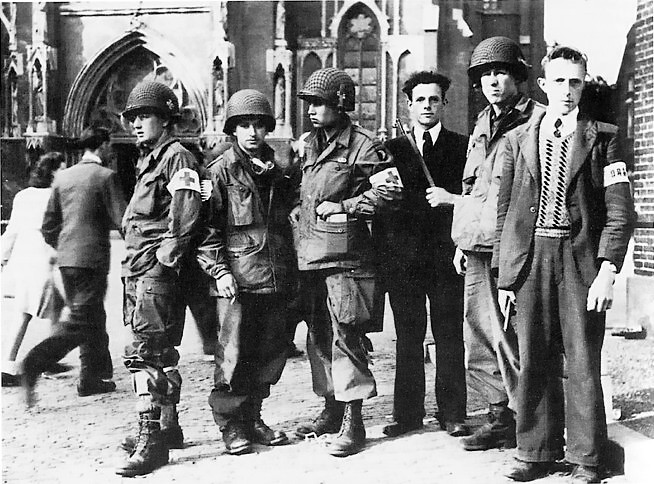
Members of the Veghel Resistance with troops of the United States 101st Airborne Division in Veghel in front of the Lambertus church during Operation Market Garden, September 1944. The resistance fighters are Bert van Roosmalen and Janus van de Meerakker from the village Eerde.

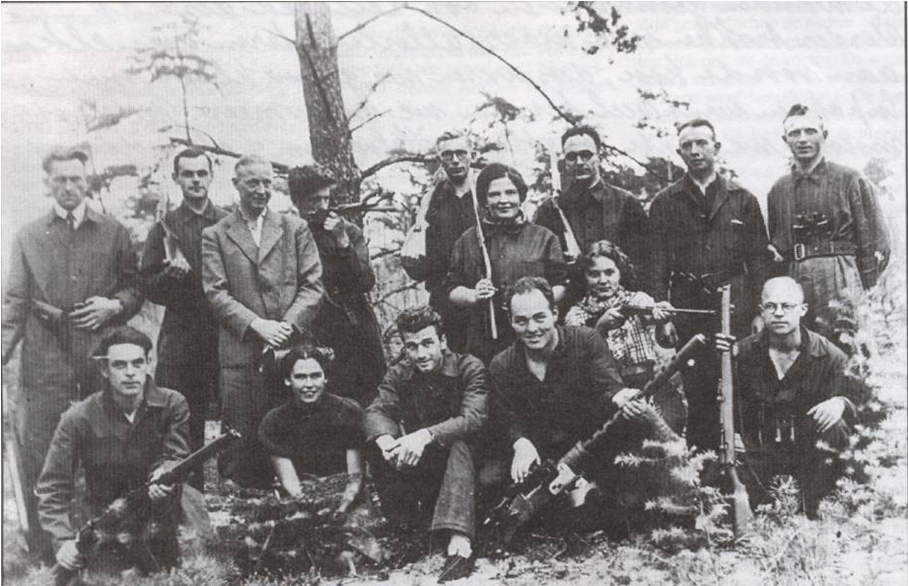
Resistance group operating near Dalfsen, Ommen, and Lemelerveld

The Dutch resistance (Dutch: Nederlands verzet) to the German occupation of the Netherlands during World War II can be mainly characterized as non-violent. The primary organizers were the Communist Party, churches, and independent groups. Over 300,000 people were hidden from German authorities in the autumn of 1944 by 60,000 to 200,000 illegal landlords and caretakers. These activities were tolerated knowingly by some one million people, including a few individuals among German occupiers and military.

The Dutch resistance developed relatively slowly, but the February strike of 1941 (which involved random police harassment and the deportation of over 400 Jews) greatly stimulated resistance. The first to organize themselves were the Dutch communists, who set up a cell-system immediately. Some other very amateurish groups also emerged, notably, De Geuzen, set up by Bernardus IJzerdraat, as well as some military-styled groups, such as the Order Service (Dutch: Ordedienst). Most had great trouble surviving betrayal in the first two years of the war.

Dutch counterintelligence, domestic sabotage, and communications networks eventually provided key support to Allied forces, beginning in 1944 and continuing until the Netherlands was fully liberated. Of the Jewish population, 105,000 out of 140,000 were murdered in the Holocaust, most of whom were murdered in Nazi death camps. A number of resistance groups specialized in saving Jewish children. The Columbia Guide to the Holocaust estimates that 215–500 Dutch Romanis were killed by the Nazis, with the higher figure estimated as almost the entire pre-war population of Dutch Romanis.

== Definition ==
The Dutch themselves, especially their official war historian Loe de Jong, director of the State Institute for War Documentation (RIOD/NIOD), distinguished among several types of resistance. Going into hiding, was generally not categorized by the Dutch as resistance because of the passive nature of such an act. Helping these so-called onderduikers (lit. "under-divers"), people who were persecuted and therefore hid from the German occupiers, was recognized as an act of resistance, but more or less reluctantly so. Non-compliance with German rules, wishes or commands, or German-condoned Dutch rule, was also not considered resistance.

Public protests by individuals, political parties, newspapers, or churches were also not considered to be resistance. Publishing illegal papers – something the Dutch were very good at, with 1,100 separate titles appearing, some reaching circulations of more than 100,000 for a population of 8.5 million – was not considered resistance per se. Only active resistance in the form of spying, sabotage, or with arms was what the Dutch considered resistance. Nevertheless, thousands of members of all the 'non-resisting' categories were arrested by the Germans and often subsequently jailed for months, tortured, sent to concentration camps, or killed.

Until the 21st century, the tendency existed in Dutch historical research and publications to not regard passive resistance as 'real' resistance. Slowly, this has started to change, in part due to the emphasis the RIOD has been putting on individual heroism since 2005. The Dutch February strike of 1941, protesting the deportation of Jews from the Netherlands, the only such strike to ever occur in Nazi-occupied Europe, is usually not defined as resistance by the Dutch. The strikers, who numbered in the tens of thousands, are not considered resistance participants. The Dutch generally prefer to use the term illegaliteit ('illegality') for all those activities that were illegal, contrary, underground, or unarmed.

After the war, the Dutch created and awarded a Resistance Cross ('Verzetskruis', not to be confused with the much lower-ranking Verzetsherdenkingskruis) to only 95 people, of whom only one was still alive when receiving the decoration, a number in stark contrast to the hundreds of thousands of Dutch men and women who performed illegal tasks at any moment during the war.

== Prelude ==
Prior to the German invasion, the Netherlands had adhered to a policy of strict neutrality. The country had strong bonds with Germany, and not so much with Britain. The Dutch had not engaged in war with any European nation since 1830. During World War I, the Dutch were not invaded by Germany and the anti-German sentiment was not as strong after the war as it was in other European countries. The German ex-Kaiser had fled to the Netherlands in 1918 and lived there in exile. The German invasion, therefore, came as a great shock to many Dutch people. Nevertheless, the country had ordered general mobilization in September 1939. By November 1938, during the Kristallnacht, many Dutch people received a foretaste of things to come; German synagogues could be seen burning, even from the Netherlands, (such as the one in Aachen). An anti-fascist movement started to gain popularity – as did the fascist movement, notably the Nationaal-Socialistische Beweging (NSB).

Despite strict neutrality, which implied shooting down British as well as German planes crossing the border into the Netherlands, the country's large merchant fleet was severely attacked by the Germans after 1 September 1939, the beginning of World War II. The sinking of the passenger-cargo liner Simon Bolivar in November 1939, killing 84 people, especially shocked the nation.

== German invasion ==
On May 10, 1940, German troops started a surprise attack on the Netherlands without a declaration of war. The day before, small groups of German troops wearing Dutch uniforms had entered the country. Many of them wore 'Dutch' helmets, some made of cardboard as they did not have enough originals. The Germans deployed about 750,000 men, three times the strength of the Dutch army; some 1,100 planes (Dutch Army Air Service: 125) and six armoured trains. They destroyed 80% of the Dutch military aircraft on the ground in one morning, mostly by bombing. The Dutch army, a cadre-militia consisting of professional officers and conscript NCOs and ranks, was inferior to the German Army in many respects: it was poorly equipped, had poor communications, and was poorly led. However, the Germans lost some 400 planes in the three days of the attack, 230 of them Junkers 52/3, the strategically essential transport for airborne infantry and paratroopers, a loss that they would never replenish and thwarted German plans for attacking England, Gibraltar and Malta with airborne forces.

The Dutch forces succeeded in defeating the Germans in the first-ever large-scale paratrooper-airborne attack in history and in recapturing the three German-occupied airfields surrounding the Hague at the end of the first day of the attack. Noteworthy were the privately financed but Army-operated anti-aircraft guns, positioned on suspected approach routes that would overfly the industries that put up the money for them. The Dutch Army Cavalry, which did not have operational tanks, deployed several squadrons of armoured cars, mainly near strategic airfields. The German follow-up attacks overland were three-pronged (Frisia-Kornwerderzand, Gelderland-Grebbe Line, Brabant-Moerdijk) and were all stopped either fully or long enough to allow the Dutch army to demolish the German air-mobile divisions and mop up the lightly armed paratroopers and airborne troops around The Hague. That circumstance, together with the anti-aircraft guns, of which German intelligence had not been aware because they had been purchased by civilians, contributed to the failure of the German units of paratroopers and airborne infantry to capture the Dutch government and force a quick surrender.

Instead, the Dutch government and queen managed to escape, and the Germans succeeded in imposing only a partial surrender. The Dutch state remained in the war as a combatant and immediately made its naval assets available for the joint allied war effort, starting with the evacuation from Dunkirk. During the Battle of the Java Sea in 1941, the British, American and Australian Navies were led by a Dutch naval officer: Rear Admiral Karel Doorman.

The major areas of intensive military resistance were:

- The Hague and the area to the north of it. Dutch forces succeeded in decimating the two German airborne divisions that had landed with the task of capturing the Dutch government. These hostilities are known as the Battle for The Hague. This unexpected setback caused panic in the German military leadership, which ordered the undefended city center of Rotterdam to be wiped out in order to force an off-the-battlefield solution and stop the effective resistance by the Dutch forces. Before this terror bombardment, the Royal Netherlands Navy managed to ship some 1300 captured German shock troops to England, providing their allies with first-hand intelligence about this novel type of airborne warfare.
- The Grebbe line, a north-south line some 50 kilometres (31 miles) east of the capital Amsterdam, from Amersfoort to the Waal, fortified, with field guns, and extensive inundations. The Dutch only surrendered after three days of hard fighting, known as the Battle of the Grebbeberg, with heavy losses on both sides. Having taken the Grebbeberg, the German forces were confronted by the next setback: during the battle the old Dutch Water Line had been inundated and thus reactivated.
- Kornwerderzand, with a bunker-complex that defended the eastern end of the Afsluitdijk connecting Friesland to North Holland and was held until ordered to capitulate. Dutch Army troops repelled wave after wave of German attackers, with support from the Royal Netherlands Navy cruising offshore on the North Sea. A small force of some 230 infantrymen stopped a complete German cavalry division in what become known as the Battle of the Afsluitdijk. The exposed stretch of dam leading to the bunker-complex became known among the Germans as the Totendam.
- Rotterdam, the bridges over the Maas River. Two school companies of Royal Netherlands Marines managed to keep a complete German army at bay until the bombardment of Rotterdam forced the commanding officer, General Winkelman, to accept a partial surrender. Elsewhere, Dutch forces stayed in the war; in Europe the fight continued from Zeeland (Battle of Zeeland) to Dunkirk, where a Dutch Royal Navy officer, Lodo van Hamel, assisted in the evacuation of allied troops. Van Hamel was first to parachute back into the Netherlands a few months later, with the mission to set up the resistance in the Netherlands. He was captured, tried and executed.

The Dutch succeeded in stopping the German advance for four days. By then, the Germans had already invaded some 70% of the country but failed to enter the urban areas to the west. The eastern provinces were relatively easy to overrun because they had been deliberately left lightly defended in order to create strategic depth. Adolf Hitler, who had expected the occupation to be completed in two hours or a maximum of two days (the invasion of Denmark in April 1940 had taken only one day), ordered Rotterdam to be annihilated to force a breakthrough as the attack was clearly failing on all fronts. That led to the Rotterdam Blitz on 14 May that destroyed much of the city centre, killed about 800 people, and left about 85,000 homeless. Furthermore, the Germans threatened to destroy every other major city until the Dutch forces capitulated. The Dutch military leadership, having lost the bulk of their air force, realized they could not stop the German bombers but managed to negotiate a tactical, instead of national, capitulation, unlike France a few weeks later. As a result, the Dutch State, unlike the French State, remained at war with Germany, and the German authorities had to ask every individual Dutch soldier to desist from further hostilities as a condition for their release from detention as a prisoner-of-war. The first act of resistance was, therefore, the refusal by members of the Dutch forces to sign any document to that effect.

The 2,000 Dutch soldiers who died defending their country, together with at least 800 civilians who perished in the flames of Rotterdam, were the first victims of a Nazi occupation that was to last five years.

== Initial German policy ==
The Nazis considered the Dutch to be fellow Aryans and were more manipulative in the Netherlands than in other occupied countries, which made the occupation seem mild at least at first. The occupation was run by the German Nazi Party rather than by the Armed Forces, which had terrible consequences for the Jewish citizens of the Netherlands. This was the case because the main goals of the Nazis were the Nazification of the populace, the creation of a large-scale aerial attack and defense system, and the integration of the Dutch economy into the German economy. As Rotterdam was already Germany's main port, it remained so, and collaboration with the enemy was widespread. Since all government ministers had successfully evaded capture by the Germans, the secretaries-general staying behind had no alternative but to carry on as well as possible under the new German rulers. The open terrain and dense population, the densest in Europe, made it difficult to conceal illegal activities; unlike, for example, the Maquis in France, who had ample hiding places. Furthermore, the country was surrounded by German-controlled territory on all sides, offering few escape routes. The entire coast was forbidden territory for all Dutch people, which makes the phenomenon of Engelandvaarder, escape to the United Kingdom, an even more remarkable act of resistance.

The first German round-up of Jews in February 1941 led to the first general strike against the Germans in Europe (and indeed one of only two such throughout occupied Europe), which shows that the general sentiment among the Dutch population was anti-German.

It was the social democrats, Catholics, and communists who started the resistance movement. Membership of an armed or military organized group could lead to prolonged stays in concentration camps, and after mid-1944, to summary execution (as a result of Hitler's orders to shoot resistance members on sight – the Niedermachungsbefehl). The increasing attacks against Dutch fascists and Germans led to large-scale reprisals, often involving dozens, even hundreds of randomly chosen people who, if not executed, were deported to concentration camps. For example, most of the adult men in the village of Putten were sent to concentration camps during the Putten raid.

The Nazis deported the Jews to concentration and extermination camps, rationed food, and withheld food stamps as punishment. They started large-scale fortifications along the coast and built some 30 airfields, paying with money they claimed from the national bank at a rate of 100 million guilders a month (the so-called 'costs of the occupation'). They also forced men between the ages of 18 and 45 to work in German factories or on public work projects. In 1944 most trains were diverted to Germany, known as 'the great train robberies', and in total some 550,000 Dutch people were selected to be sent to Germany as forced laborers. Males over the age of 14 were deemed 'able to work' and females over the age of 15. Over the next five years, as conditions became increasingly difficult, resistance became better organized and more forceful. The resistance managed to kill high-ranking collaborationist Dutch officials, such as General Hendrik Seyffardt.

In the Netherlands, the Germans managed to exterminate a relatively large proportion of the Jews. They were found more easily because before the war the Dutch authorities had required citizens to register their religion so that church taxes could be distributed among the various religious organizations. Furthermore, shortly after Germany took over the government, they demanded all Dutch public servants fill out an "Aryan Attestation" in which they were asked to state in detail their religious and ethnic ancestry. The American author Mark Klempner writes, "Though there was some protest, not just from the government employees, but from several churches and universities, in the end, all but twenty of 240,000 Dutch civil servants signed and returned the form." In addition, the country was occupied by the oppressive SS rather than the Wehrmacht as in the other Western European countries, as well as the fact that the occupying forces were generally under the command of Austrians who were keen to show that they were 'good Germans' by implementing anti-Semitic policy. The Dutch public transport organization and the police collaborated to a large extent in the transportation of the Jews.

== Resistance organization ==
As early as 15 May 1940, the day after the Dutch capitulation, the Communist Party of the Netherlands (CPN) held a meeting to organize their underground existence and resistance against the German occupiers. It was the first resistance organization in the country. As a result, some 2,000 communists were to lose their lives in torture rooms, concentration camps or by firing squad. On the same day Bernardus IJzerdraat distributed leaflets protesting against the German occupation and called on the public to resist the Germans. This was the first public act of resistance. IJzerdraat started to build an illegal resistance organization called De Geuzen, named after a group who rebelled against Spanish occupation in the 16th century.

A few months after the German invasion, a number of Revolutionary Socialist Worker's Party (RSAP) members including Henk Sneevliet formed the Marx–Lenin–Luxemburg Front. Its entire leadership was caught and executed in April 1942. The CPN and the RSAP were the only pre-war organizations that went underground and protested against the antisemitic action taken by the German occupiers.

According to CIA historian Stewart Bentley, there were four major resistance organizations in the country by the middle of 1944, independent of each other:

- National Organization for Helping People in Hiding (Landelijke Organisatie voor Hulp aan Onderduikers or LO), the most successful illegal organization in Europe, set up in 1942 by Helena Kuipers-Rietberg and Frits Slomp. The LO ran its own illegal social services program, the Nationaal Steun Fonds ("National Support Funds"), which were administered by Walraven van Hall and paid a kind of dole on a regular basis throughout the war to all families in need, including relatives of sailors and hideaways. Of the 12,000 to 14,000 participants in the LO, 1,104 were killed or died in prison camps.
- National Assault Group (Landelijke Knokploeg or LKP, literally "brawl crew" or "goon squad"), with about 750 members in the summer of 1944 conducting sabotage operations and occasional assassinations. The LKP provided many of the ration cards to the LO through raids. Leendert Valstar ('Bertus'), Jacques van der Horst ('Louis') and Hilbert van Dijk ('Arie') organized local Assault Groups into the LKP in 1943. The number of members of the LKP is rather precise since their members were registered after the war. 2,277 was their number in September 1944. A third were members before this time. 514 members of the LKP died. Only one of the top LKP members survived the war – Liepke Scheepstra. Helena Kuipers-Rietberg, one of the founders of the LO, was betrayed and died in Ravensbruck concentration camp.
- Council of Resistance (Raad van Verzet or RVV), engaged in sabotage, assassinations, and the protection of people in hiding.
- Order Service (Ordedienst, Orde Dienst, or OD), a group preparing for the return of the exiled Dutch government. The Dutch Secret Service (Geheime Dienst Nederland or GDN) was the intelligence arm of the OD.

=== CS 6 ===
Another, more radical group, was called 'CS-6'. It was probably named for the address where they were based, 6 Corelli street in Amsterdam. According to Loe de Jong, they were by far the most deadly of the resistance groups, committing some 20 assassinations. Having been started in 1940 by the brothers Gideon and Jan Karel ('Janka') Boissevain, the group grew quickly to some 40 members and made contact with the Dutch communist and surgeon Gerrit Kastein.

They targeted the highest-ranking Dutch collaborators and traitors, but duly became the victim of the most dangerous Dutch traitor and German spy, Anton van der Waals. Included in the list of their victims was the Dutch General Seyffardt, who was used by the Germans to head the Dutch SS-legion. They also managed to assassinate an assistant minister, Hermannus Reydon, and several police chiefs. However, the planned assassination of the best known Dutch traitor and collaborator, Dutch Nazi-party leader Anton Mussert, was delayed and could never be accomplished. Their activities in eliminating Dutch collaborators prompted the 1943 'Silbertanne' covert murder reprisals by the Dutch SS. By 1944 treason and strain had decimated their ranks.

=== NSF ===
In addition to these groups, the NSF ("Nationaal Steun Fonds", or National Support Fund) financial organization received money from the exiled government to fund operations of the LO and KP. It also set up large-scale scams involving the national bank and the tax service that were never discovered. The principal figure of the NSF was the banker Walraven van Hall, whose activities were discovered by chance by the Nazis and who was shot at the age of 39. Because of Van Hall's work, the Dutch resistance was never short of money. A monument for van Hall was opened in Amsterdam in September 2010.

=== Churches ===
The Reformed churches and the Catholic churches joined together in resisting Nazi occupation. The Netherlands was about 48 percent Reformed churches and 36 percent Catholic churches at that time. Previous to the war the split between the Reformed churches and Catholic churches was profound. The resistance brought the churches together in their common struggle. In 1941, they jointly condemned the government's laws and actions, and formed ecumenical bonds that denounced anti-Semitism in all its forms. Many Catholic and Reformed churches became the centre of resistance activities in all but name. The clergy also paid a high price: Forty-three reformed clergy were killed and forty-six Catholic priests lost their lives.

Both denominations cooperated with many illegal organizations and made funds available, for instance, to save Jewish children. Many priests and ministers were arrested and deported; some died, such as Carmelite priest Titus Brandsma, a professor of philosophy and an early outspoken critic of Nazism, who eventually succumbed to illness in Dachau concentration camp, and Father Raskin, a priest in the CICM Missionaries, who operated under the codename Leopold Vindictive 200 and was beheaded by the Gestapo on 18 October 1943. Monseigneur De Jong, archbishop of Utrecht, was a steadfast leader of the Catholic community and an opponent of the German occupiers. The Catholic stance on the protection of converted Jews, among others Edith Stein, a philosopher who was then also a nun in a Dutch convent, led to special prosecution of those Jews, sister Stein being deported. After the war, captured documents showed that the Germans feared the role of the churches, especially when Catholics and Protestants worked together.

== Resistance activities ==
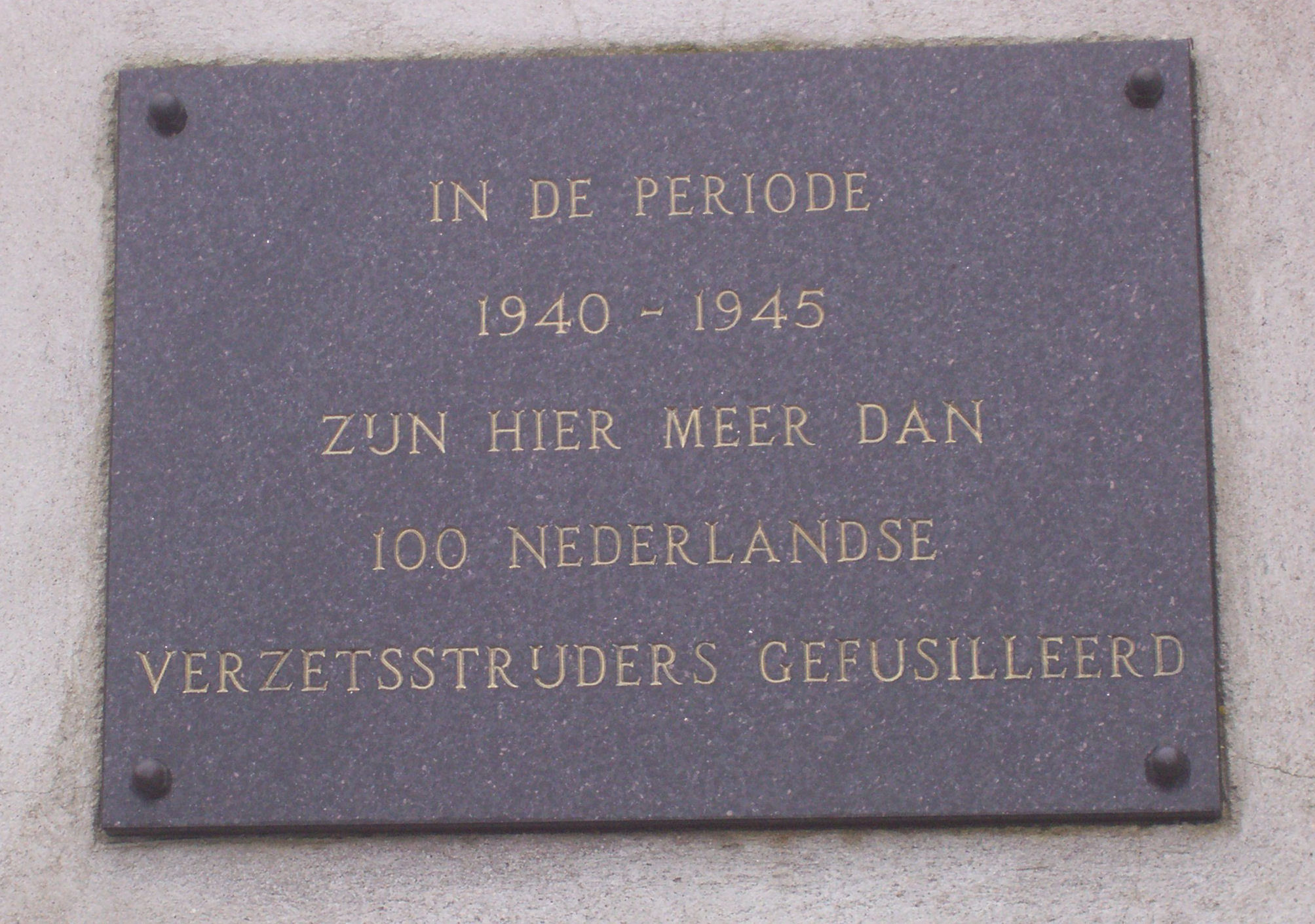
Plaque honouring the Dutch resistance members executed by the Germans at Sachsenhausen concentration camp

On 25 February 1941, the Communist Party of the Netherlands called for a general strike, the 'February strike', in response to the first Nazi raid on Amsterdam's Jewish population. The old Jewish quarter in Amsterdam had been cordoned off into a ghetto and as retaliation for a number of violent incidents that followed, 425 Jewish men were taken hostage by the Germans and eventually deported to extermination camps, just two surviving. Many citizens of Amsterdam, regardless of their political affiliation, joined in a mass protest against the deportation of Jewish Dutch citizens. The next day, factories in Zaandam, Haarlem, IJmuiden, Weesp, Bussum, Hilversum and Utrecht joined in. The strike was largely put down within a day with German troops firing on unarmed crowds, killing nine people and wounding 24, as well as taking many prisoners. Opposition to the German occupation intensified as a result of the violence against non-combative Dutch people. The only other general strike in Nazi-occupied Europe was the general strike in occupied Luxembourg in 1942. The Dutch struck four more times against the Germans: the students' strike in November 1940, the doctors' strike in 1942, the April–May strike in 1943 and the railway strike in 1944.

The February strike was also unusual for the Dutch resistance, which was more covert. Resistance in the Netherlands initially took the form of small-scale, decentralized cells engaged in independent activities, mostly small-scale sabotage (such as cutting phone lines, distributing anti-German leaflets or tearing down posters). Some small groups had no links with others. They produced forged ration cards and counterfeit money, collected intelligence, published underground papers such as De Waarheid, Trouw, Vrij Nederland, and Het Parool. They also sabotaged phone lines and railways, produced maps, and distributed food and goods.

One of the most widespread resistance activities was hiding and sheltering refugees and enemies of the Nazi regime, which included concealing Jewish families like that of Anne Frank, underground operatives, draft-age Dutchmen and, later in the war, Allied aircrew. Collectively these people were known as onderduikers ('people in hiding' or literally: 'under-divers'). Corrie ten Boom and her family were among those who successfully hid several Jews and resistance workers from the Nazis. The first people who went into hiding were German Jews who had arrived in the Netherlands before 1940. In the first weeks after the surrender, some British soldiers who could not get to Dunkirk (Duinkerken) in French Flanders hid with farmers in Dutch Flanders. In the winter of 1940–1941 many French escaped prisoners of war passed through the Netherlands. One single-family in Oldenzaal helped 200 men. In total, about 4,000 mainly French, some Belgian, Polish, Russian and Czech ex-POWs were aided on their way south in the province of Limburg. The number of people cared for by the LO in July 1944 is estimated to be between 200,000 and 350,000. This activity was very risky, and 1,671 members of the LO-LKP organizations lost their lives.

On 22 September 1944, members of the LKP, RVV and a small number of the OD in the southern liberated part of the Netherlands became a Dutch army unit: the Stoottroepen. This was during Operation Market Garden. Three battalions, without any military training, were formed in Brabant and three in Limburg. The first and second battalions from Brabant were involved in guarding the front line along the Waal and Meuse rivers with the British 2nd Army. The third battalion from Brabant was incorporated into a Polish formation of the Canadian 2nd Army on the front line on the islands of Tholen and Sint Philipsland. The second and third battalions from Limburg were included in the 9th American Army and were involved in guarding the front line from Roosteren to Aix la Chapelle (Aachen/Aken). During the Battle of the Bulge (December 1944), they were repositioned on the line Aix-la-Chapelle to Liège (Luik). The first battalion from Limburg was an occupational force in Germany in the area between Cologne (Köln), Aix-la-Chapelle and the Dutch border. The second and third battalions from Limburg accompanied the American push into Germany in March 1945 up to Magdeburg, Brunswick and Oschersleben.

=== Reprisals under Operation Silbertanne ===
After Hitler had approved Anton Mussert as "Leider van het Nederlandse Volk" (Leader of the Dutch People) in December 1942, he was allowed to form a national government institute, a Dutch shadow cabinet called "Gemachtigden van den Leider", which would advise Reichskommissar Arthur Seyss-Inquart from February 1, 1943. The institute would consist of a number of deputies in charge of defined functions or departments within the administration.

On February 4, retired General and Rijkscommissaris Hendrik Seyffardt, already head of the Dutch SS volunteer group Vrijwilligerslegioen Nederland, was announced through the press as “Deputy for Special Services”. As a result, the Communist resistance group CS-6 under Gerrit Kastein, concluded that the new institute would eventually lead to a National-Socialist government, which would then introduce general conscription to enable the call-up of Dutch nationals for the Eastern Front. However, in reality, the Nazi's only saw Mussert and the NSB as a useful tools to enable general co-operation. Furthermore, Seyss-Inquart had assured Mussert after his December 1942 meeting with Hitler that general conscription was not on the agenda. However, CS-6 assessed that Seyffardt was the first person within the new institute eligible for an attack, after the heavily guarded Mussert.

After approval from the Dutch government-in-exile, on the evening of Friday 5 February 1943, after answering a knock at his front door in Scheveningen, The Hague, Seyffardt was shot twice by student Jan Verleun who had accompanied Kastein on the mission. A day later Seyffardt succumbed to his injuries in the hospital. A private military ceremony was arranged at the Binnenhof, attended by family and friends and with Mussert in attendance, after which Seyffardt was cremated. On 7 February, CS-6 shot fellow institute member Gemachtigde Voor de Volksvoorlichting (Attorney for the national relations) H. Reydon and his wife. His wife died on the spot, while Reydon died on 24 August of his injuries. The gun used in this attack had been given to Kastein by Sicherheitsdienst agent Van der Waals, and after tracking him back through information, arrested him on 19 February. Two days later Kastein committed suicide so as not to give away Dutch Resistance information under torture.

Seyffardt and Reydon's deaths led to massive reprisals in the occupied Netherlands, under Operation Silbertanne. SS General Hanns Albin Rauter immediately ordered the murder of 50 Dutch hostages and a series of raids on Dutch universities. By accident the Dutch resistance had attacked Rauter's car on 6 March 1945, which in turn led to the killings at De Woeste Hoeve, where 117 men were rounded up and executed at the site of the ambush and another 147 Gestapo prisoners were executed elsewhere. On 1–2 October 1944, a similar war crime occurred in the Putten raid. After a car carrying officers of the German Army was ambushed near the village of Putten by the Dutch resistance, on the orders of Wehrmachtbefehlshaber in den Niederlanden (Supreme Commander of the Wehrmacht in the Netherlands) General Friedrich Christiansen, the village of Putten was raided by German forces. Several civilians were shot, the village was burned and 661 of the men of the town were deported to concentration camps, where the vast majority of whom died.

=== "England-Voyagers" ===
A little more than 1,700 Dutch people managed to escape to England and offered themselves to their exiled Queen Wilhelmina for service against the Germans. They were called the Engelandvaarders, named after some 200 who had travelled by boat across the North Sea; most of the other 1,500 went across land to neutral countries before crossing the water.

Some figures are especially noteworthy: Erik Hazelhoff Roelfzema, whose life was described in his book and made into a film and a musical Soldaat van Oranje, Peter Tazelaar and Bob or Bram van der Stok, who, after fighting air battles over the Netherlands during the initial German attack, managed to escape and who became a squadron leader in No. 322 Squadron RAF. Van der Stok's RAF Spitfire was shot down over France and he was taken prisoner by the Germans. Van der Stok became one of only three successful escapees of 'the Great Escape' from Stalag Luft III, and the only one to succeed in returning to England to rejoin the fight as a fighter pilot.

=== Radio ===
A major role in keeping the Dutch resistance alive was played by the BBC Radio Oranje, the broadcasting service of the Dutch government-in-exile and Radio Herrijzend Nederland which broadcast from the Southern part of the country. Listening to either program was forbidden and after about a year the Germans decided to confiscate all Dutch radio receivers, with some listeners managing to replace their sets with homemade receivers. Surprisingly the authorities failed to outlaw the publication of magazine articles explaining how to build sets or the sale of the necessary materials until many months later. When they eventually did there were leaflets dropped from British planes containing instructions on building sets and directional aerials to circumvent German jamming.

=== Press ===
The Dutch managed to set up a remarkably large underground press that led to some 1,100 titles. Some of these were never more than hand-copied newsletters, while others were printed in larger runs and grew to become newspapers and magazines some of which still exist today, such as Trouw, Het Parool, and Vrij Nederland.

Train with exhibition about the resistance, 1949

== After Normandy ==
Following the Normandy invasion in June 1944, the Dutch civilian population was put under increasing pressure by Allied infiltration and the need for intelligence regarding the German military defensive buildup, the instability of German positions and active fighting. Portions of the country were liberated as part of the Allied Drive to the Siegfried Line. The unsuccessful Allied airborne Operation Market Garden liberated Eindhoven and Nijmegen, but the attempt to secure bridges and transport lines around Arnhem in mid-September failed, partly because British forces disregarded intelligence offered by the Dutch resistance about German strength and position of enemy forces and declined help with communications from the resistance. The Battle of the Scheldt, aimed at opening the Belgian port of Antwerp, liberated the south-west Netherlands the following month.

While the south was liberated, Amsterdam and the rest of the north remained under Nazi control until their official surrender on 5 May 1945. For these eight months Allied forces held off, fearing huge civilian losses, and hoping for a rapid collapse of the German government. When the Dutch government-in-exile asked for a national railway strike as a resistance measure, the German occupiers stopped food transports to the western Netherlands, and this set the stage for the "Hunger winter", the Dutch famine of 1944.

374 Dutch resistance fighters are buried in the Field of Honour in the Dunes around Bloemendaal. In total, some 2,000 Dutch resistance members were killed by the Germans. Their names are recorded in a memorial ledger Erelijst van Gevallenen 1940–1945, kept in the Dutch parliament and available online since 2010.

== Main figures in the Dutch resistance ==
Alphabetically ordered to the Dutch system with the IJ after the X, and adverbs not counted

- Aart Alblas, Royal Netherlands Navy officer
- Willem Arondeus, resistance member in Amsterdam, bombed the Amsterdam Public Records Office in 1943
- Frieda Belinfante, member who helped organize and execute the bombing of the Amsterdam Public Records Office in 1943
- Carolina Bunjes, Jewish communist that sheltered Jews in Scheveningen from the Gestapo and hid weapons for the resistance in Friesland
- Christiaan Boers
- Corrie ten Boom, Christian resistance organizer
- Wieke Bosch, Anarchist and feminist, saved Jews and was deported to Ravensbruck
- Esmée van Eeghen, active in Leeuwarden
- Diet Eman, Christian resistance member, author of Things We Couldn't Say
- Jack van der Geest
- Jan Gies, husband of Miep Gies and her fellow helper who hid and cared for Anne Frank, her family, and the others in hiding with them
- Jan van Gilse, composer and conductor and resistance member in Amsterdam
- Frans Goedhart, founder of Het Parool
- Daniël Goulooze, Jewish construction worker, communist and Soviet agent
- Karl Gröger, executed for his role in carrying out the bombing of the Amsterdam Public Records Office in 1943
- Nicolaas Van 't Wout, factory executive who turned into a Geuzen resistance member and died in the Buchenwald concentration camp
- Paul de Groot, Jewish communist leader
- Frits van Hall, sculptor executed for his role in the Dutch resistance in 1945
- Suzy van Hall, dancer who was sent to Dachau concentration camp
- Walraven van Hall, 'banker of the resistance', considered one of the leading figures in the Dutch resistance
- Rachel Harel, courier
- Erik Hazelhoff Roelfzema; student and a secret agent
- Jan van Hoof
- Johannes de Jong, Archbishop of Utrecht
- Ernst de Jonge, lawyer and Olympic rower
- Gerrit Kastein, surgeon and communist activist in CS 6
- Anda Kerkhoven, only University of Groningen student executed by the Nazis
- Anton de Kom, Afro-Dutch communist resistance leader
- Aart Gerardus Lekskes
- Johan Limpers, sculptor and resistance member
- George Maduro, a Jewish officer
- Lau Mazirel, lawyer who helped plan the bombing of the Amsterdam Public Records Office in 1943
- Geertruida Middendorp
- Martinus Nijhoff, poet who helped plan the bombing of the Amsterdam Public Records Office in 1943
- Allard Oosterhuis, family doctor; organizer of escape routes to Sweden and Switzerland
- Mona Louise Parsons
- Jaap Penraat
- Henri Pieck
- Henriëtte Pimentel (1876–1943), smuggled hundreds of Jewish children out of her crèche
- Joannes Cassianus Pompe, pathologist executed for sabotage
- Gerard Reeskamp
- Father Raskin, who operated under the codename Leopold Vindictive 200 and was beheaded by the Gestapo on 18 October 1943
- Willem Sandberg, curator at the Stedelijk Museum who helped plan the bombing of the Amsterdam Public Records Office in 1943
- Hannie Schaft, "the girl with the red hair", communist resistance assassination agent
- Truus Menger-Oversteegen communist resistance assassination agent
- Freddie Oversteegen communist resistance assassination agent
- Kees Schalker, Communist resistance leader
- Cornelius Maria Schoormans, Escaped German Work Camp - Resistance Leader. His journal is in the Resistance Museum in Amsterdam
- Pierre Schunck of the Valkenburg resistance
- Pieter Meindert Schreuder, a resistance leader in Groningen
- Henk Sneevliet, Marxist resistance leader
- Han Stijkel, an armed resistance leader in The Hague, bombed the Amsterdam Public Records Office
- Trix Terwindt, MI9 agent
- Bram van der Stok
- Tina Strobos, a medical student who smuggled resistance supplies and hid Jewish refugees in her house
- Jacoba van Tongeren, the female leader of Group 2000
- Gerrit van der Veen, sculptor and resistance leader in Amsterdam, bombed the Amsterdam Public Records Office in 1943
- Koos Vorrink, socialist politician and resistance leader
- Gerben Wagenaar, Communist resistance leader
- Joop Westerweel, a schoolteacher and Christian anarchist, leader of the Westerweel Group resistance group
- Bernardus IJzerdraat, one of the first to resist

== See also ==
- Binnenlandse Strijdkrachten
- Dutch underground press
- Englandspiel
- Netherlands in World War II
- Resistance during World War II
- Verzetsmuseum
