= Anda Kerkhoven =

Dutch resistance fighter

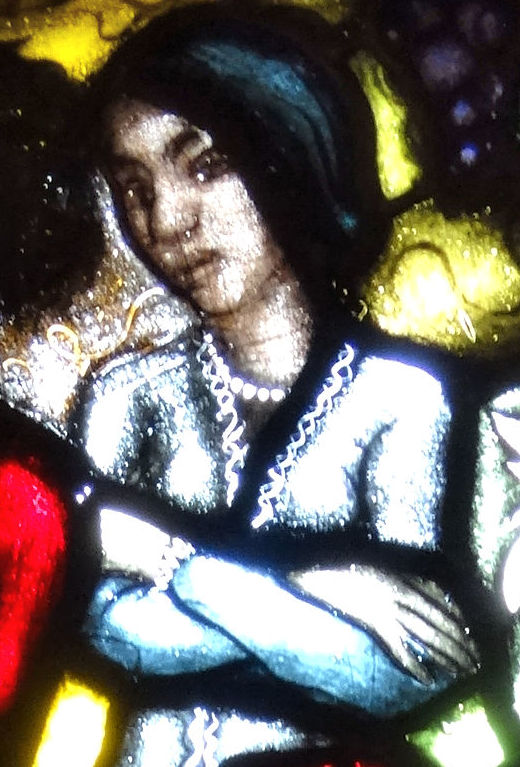

Melisande Tatiana Marie (Anda) Kerkhoven (10 April 1919 in Saint-Cloud, France – 19 March 1945 in Glimmen, The Netherlands) was a woman who joined the resistance during World War II. She was an important courier of the De Groot'-group of Gerrit Boekhoven in Groningen. On 19 March 1945 she was shot by Dutch accomplices of the Sicherheitsdienst.

== Early life ==
Anda Kerkhoven was born on 10 April 1919, a daughter of Adriaan Rudolph Willem Kerkhoven and Constance Paulina Bosccha. Kerkhoven grew up in the Dutch East Indies in a relatively rich family: Her father owned a rubber and tea company named Panoembangan. The family made regular trips: Kerkhoven was born on a holiday in France, and later she wrote about trips she made to the Lake Geneva in Switzerland.

From an early age on, Kerkhoven was known for her clear opinion. Her strong beliefs on animal rights sometimes brought her into conflict with her father, who liked to hunt.

== Education ==
Until 1929, when her parents divorced, Kerkhoven went to a private school in the Dutch East Indies. Then, Kerkhoven went to primary and secondary school in The Hague, the Netherlands, but did final exams in the East Indies again.

In the following period, Kerkhoven studied medicine at the Medische Hogeschool (medical University) in Batavia. Here she needed to perform vivisection which, as a strict vegetarian and animal lover, she didn't want to. Therefore, in 1938, she went to the University of Groningen, one of the few Universities that didn't have an obligation to perform vivisection during medicine study. She lived with the Hendriks family, which she later joined in the World War II-resistance.

A month after starting her degree of studies, Kerkhoven started publishing in student paper Der Clercke Cronike. She wrote pieces stating her pacifism and about the German occupation in WWII, which were sometimes misunderstood and heavily discussed. Kerkhoven said the Jewish persecution was a result of mass insanity. Her last article for the Cronike ended: "whoever can risk their life for military defense, can also risk it for pacifist defense."

At the time of her study, Kerkhoven was also part of Dye Line Trekkers, a drawing society affiliated with student society Magna Pete. This society was led by Groningen painter Johan Dijkstra, one of the founders of the Groningen art circle De Ploeg. Here, Kerkhoven stood as a model for various paintings.

== During World War II ==
After the start of World War II, Kerkhoven continued to argue for nonviolent resistance. In 1942 she joined the resistance group 'De Groot', led by Gerrit Boekhoven. Their resistance activities consisted of making forged official documents, maintaining contacts between resistance fighters and distributing ration cards, not through violent robberies, but through making contacts. This pacifist resistance group soon played a central role in the distribution of ration cards in the north of the Netherlands, and Kerkhoven was an important courier. She also wrote illegal pamphlets about charity and morally correct conduct, which she reproduced and distributed through mailboxes herself.

Shortly after Christmas, on 27 December 1944, Kerkhoven was arrested by four members of the Sicherheitsdienst (SD) in her home in De Ranitzstraat in Groningen, after helping a 4-year-old Jewish girl to go into hiding She was subjected to severe physical and mental torture in the Scholtenhuis (nicknamed 'the porch of hell') in Groningen for months. Despite the pain and misery, Kerkhoven has, based on the available German records, always remained silent about the names and whereabouts of her fellow resistance fighters. Because of this, members of the SD gave her the nickname 'Katjang', meaning 'wicked girl'. After Gerrit Boekhoven and Dinie Aikema were also arrested in January 1945, almost the entire De Groot Group was rounded up.

== Death ==
On 19 March 1945, about 20 days before the end of WWII in Groningen, Anda Kerkhoven was shot by Dutch SD member Meindert Vonk. The execution happened on the edge of the Quintus forest at the Oosterbroekweg, near Glimmen. Twenty to thirty other Dutch people were executed here and their bodies were buried in a mass grave.

After the war, the remains of Kerkhoven were first transferred to the Northern Cemetery in Groningen. Her tombstone here read: "She lived and died for her principles of humanity and freedom". In 1967, she arrived at her final resting place at the Dutch National Field of Honor in Loenen.

== Remembrance ==
Kerkhoven's landlord from the Ranitzstraat in Groningen, Karel Hendriks, was also arrested for a short time. After his release, he commemorates Kerkhoven in the resistance magazine 'De Vonk', in June 1945. He wrote: "Let Anda's spirit live on. To lend a hand just to help, without self-benefit as a background, that is true socialism. This alone is the key to a better society. When people support socialism out of self-interest, it cannot but lead to oppression and dictatorship, for the strongest among them will push themselves forward… Out of self-interest."

There is a memorial stone placed in front of Anda's former home and in 2003, a memorial stone was unveiled on the spot where she was shot in 1945.

The Rector Magnificus of the University of Groningen, Combertus Willem van der Pot remembered Anda Kerkhoven in his commemorative speech on 23 June 1945. He acknowledged her for being the only student of Groningen who had been executed by the Germans for her involvement in the resistance. She went down in history as an unyielding resistance fighter and an inspired idealist. Her name is included in the plaque commemorating the fallen members of the academic community and she is depicted in a stained glass window by the artist Johan Dijkstra, both in the Academy Building of the University of Groningen.

In 2008, a planetoide discovered in 1990 by the Belgian astronomer Eric Walter Elst was named after Kerkhoven.

In November 2021, the Groningen city council moved to name its civic hall after Anda Kerkhoven.
