= Han Stijkel =

Dutch resistance activist (1911–1943)

- Born: 8 October 1911; Rotterdam
- Died: 4 June 1943 (aged 31); Berlin, Nazi Germany
- Occupation: Academic

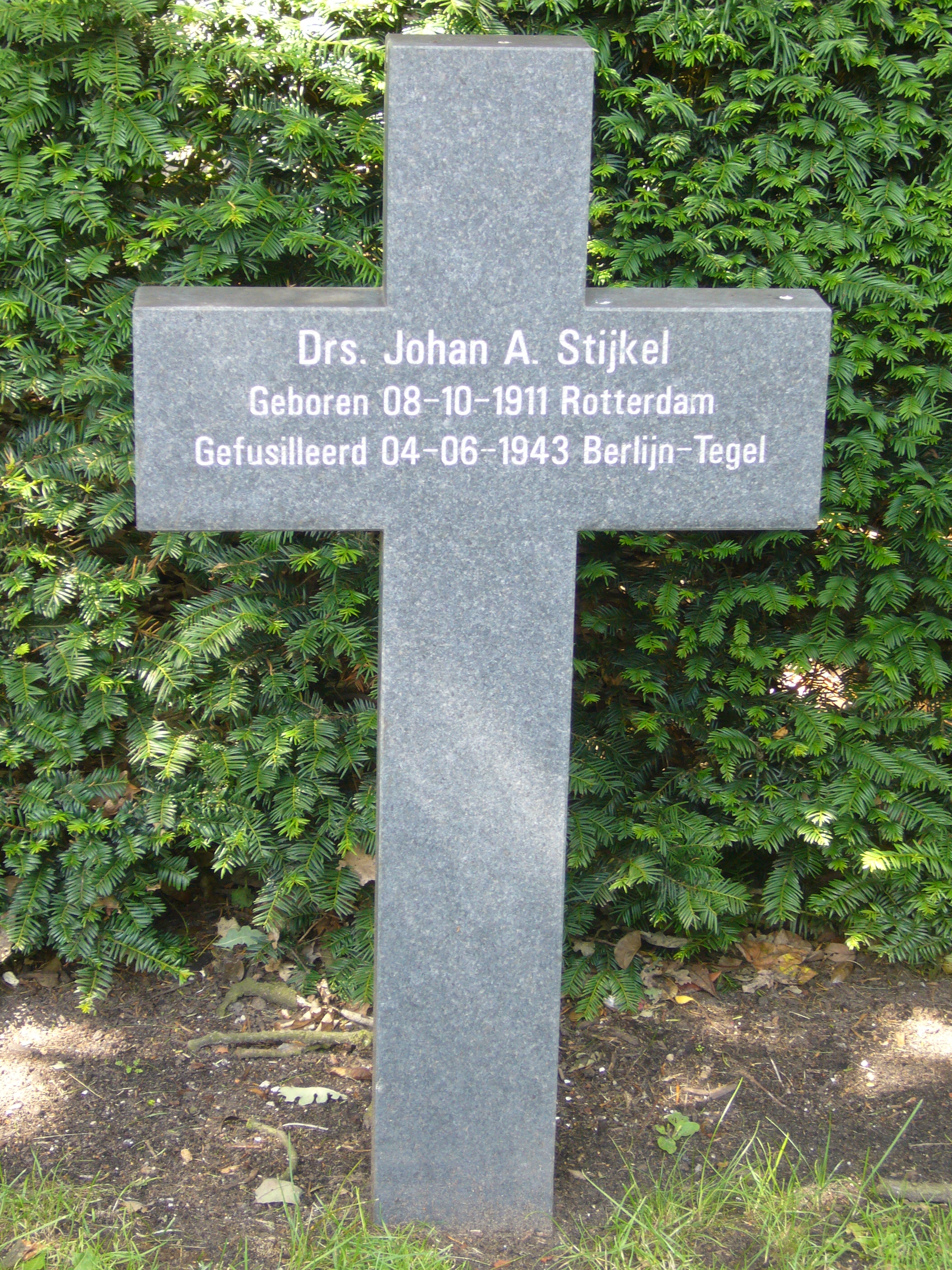
Grave of Han Stijkel in The Hague

Johan Aaldrik (Han) Stijkel (8 October 1911 in Rotterdam – 4 June 1943 in Berlin-Tegel) was an academic and a Dutch Resistance activist.

== Biography ==
Stijkel was born in Rotterdam on October 8, 1911. He pursued an English degree at the University of Amsterdam before getting involved in resistance movements in Europe. He was involved in the struggle against fascism in Portugal and also took part in the struggle against Francisco Franco during the Spanish Civil War.

According to Jacob Schorer, Stijkel was a homosexual, based on a letter preserved in the archive of his friend Jan Van Leeuwen.

== The Stijkel Group ==
Han Stijkel was the leader of the Stijkel Group. It was originally founded as part of the Ordedienst (OD) in 1941 and had around 80 members, who were police officers, students, officers, and merchants. The group was mainly involved in the recruitment of resistance fighters and espionage.

Stijkel commanded the Stijkel Group until their betrayal in 1942. Traitors who infiltrated the group pressured him to deliver espionage material to the government exiled in London. He was apprehended on April 2, 1941 aboard the KW133, which included the traitor Jan van Wezel, an infiltrator for the Sicherheitspolizei.

Members of the Stijkel Group were imprisoned at the Wehrmachtuntersuchungsgefängnis at 3 Lehrterstrasse in Berlin, Untersuchungshaftanstalt Moabit, and Untersuchungsgefängnis Charlottenburg. Stijkel was the first of the group to be executed in Berlin.

== Sources ==
- Harald Poelchau, 1949: Die letzten Stunden. Erinnerungen eines Gefängnispfarrers (illustrations by A. Stenbock-Fermor). Berlin: Volk und Welt
- Bert J. Davidson, 2014: Het dagboek van Barend Davidson. Een Zwolse Jood in het verzet (ed. Menno van der Laan). Eindhoven: DATO ISBN 9789462260948
