= Jack van der Geest =

- Born: 17 September 1923
- Died: 5 March 2009 (aged 85)

Jack van der Geest (September 17, 1923 – March 5, 2009) was one of only seven people to escape from Buchenwald concentration camp. He escaped on March 3, 1943. A copy of his own death certificate appears in his book, Was God on Vacation? He was a member of the Dutch resistance movement and French Resistance, afterwards he became a translator for the 101st Airborne during World War II.

== Biography ==
Jacobus Petrus Cornelis van der Geest, known as "Jack", was born at Teijlerstraat 58 in The Hague, Netherlands. He was a member of both the Dutch and French Resistance. Van der Geest and his father, Jacobus van der Geest, were heavily involved in Dutch resistance activities, including hiding Jews. Van der Geest's father was president of Lensveld Nikola, a bread factory in The Hague. He had worked his way up from being an errand boy at the factory at age 14 to eventually become president. This was the only factory at the time that brought bread to the Dutch queen. Van der Geest's father (b. November 7, 1896) was sent to Kamp Vught and was killed there on February 19, 1943. It was previously thought that his father had died in Dachau, however, records recovered in spring 2009 indicate he was killed in Vught.

In May 1940, van der Geest and his friend, Fred de Koning, were in Rotterdam during the bombing of the De Bijenkorf Department Store. De Koning's father, an accountant, died in the bombing of Rotterdam. Van der Geest was also a close friend of a Jewish family in The Hague, the Cohens, who owned a clothing store there. Van der Geest and Sam Cohen were close friends. The Cohen family were sent to the death camps and presumably were murdered in the Holocaust.

Van der Geest was educated at an Aviation Institute in Scheveningen. On his graduation date in 1942, he decided not to go the graduation and found out later the Nazis had forcibly enlisted the graduating class for Hitler's war machine.

In September 1942, the Gestapo raided the van der Geest apartment in the Hague (Soestdijksekade 43 - 3rd floor). They were betrayed by a neighbor. Jack and his parents were taken first to the Oranjehotel. Van der Geest's mother, Anna (née de Groot in 1894) was sent to Ravensbrück concentration camp in September 1942, where she was held for three and a half months before being released. She survived the war and died in The Hague in 1961. Van der Geest's sister, Wilhelmina (Willie), was not home during the raid, so she was not arrested. She died in 1991 in The Hague.

Van der Geest was sent to Buchenwald and was incarcerated there from September 15, 1942 to March 3, 1943. His prisoner number was 512601. He stayed in Block 46 and survived brutal medical experiments at the hands of Dr. Erwin Ding-Schuler. He escaped on March 3, 1943 by pretending to be dead prior to the 5:00 a.m. roll call at Buchenwald. He was thrown into a pile of bodies approximately 50 yards (46 m) long and four feet (1.2 m) feet high. He lay there for 11 hours, and then, weighing about 80 pounds (36 kg), killed an SS Guard, put on his uniform and rode a truck out of camp. He then traveled to Neufchâteau, France where, with the assistance of Maquis members Dr. Marvell, a dentist, and his wife Cherie, he became a member of the French Resistance.

Van der Geest later became attached to the 101st Airborne Division as an interpreter. He became a U.S. citizen in 1953 and later joined the U.S. Air Force. In 1995, he wrote a book titled Was God on Vacation?. The third edition of the book, published in 2002, includes a copy of his Buchenwald Death Certificate. He lived in Rapid City, South Dakota for more than 55 years. He was a member of the USA 101st Airborne association (#3272).

September 17, 2008, van der Geest's 85th birthday, was commemorated by a tribute made in the U.S. Senate by Senator John Thune.

March 3, 2009, was Jack van der Geest Day in Rapid City and the State of South Dakota in celebration of the 66th anniversary of his escape. He died unexpectedly two days later at Rapid City Regional Hospital of natural causes. He was declared dead by the hospital at 4:59 am.

He is buried in Calvary Cemetery on Sheridan Lake Road in Rapid City, South Dakota.

After his death, the South Dakota State Senate issued a resolution honoring Jack van der Geest.
