= Woeste Hoeve =

Coordinates: 52°6′18″N 5°57′5″E

De Woeste Hoeve is a hamlet in the Netherlands between Apeldoorn and Arnhem, which is remembered for an incident in the Second World War when, during the night of 6 March 1945, Dutch resistance fighters shot the Nazi Chief of Police, SS General Hanns Rauter.

The shooting occurred accidentally when a group of six resistance fighters were on an assignment to capture a German truck so that they could steal food intended for the Germans. They chose Woeste Hoeve because of its remote location.

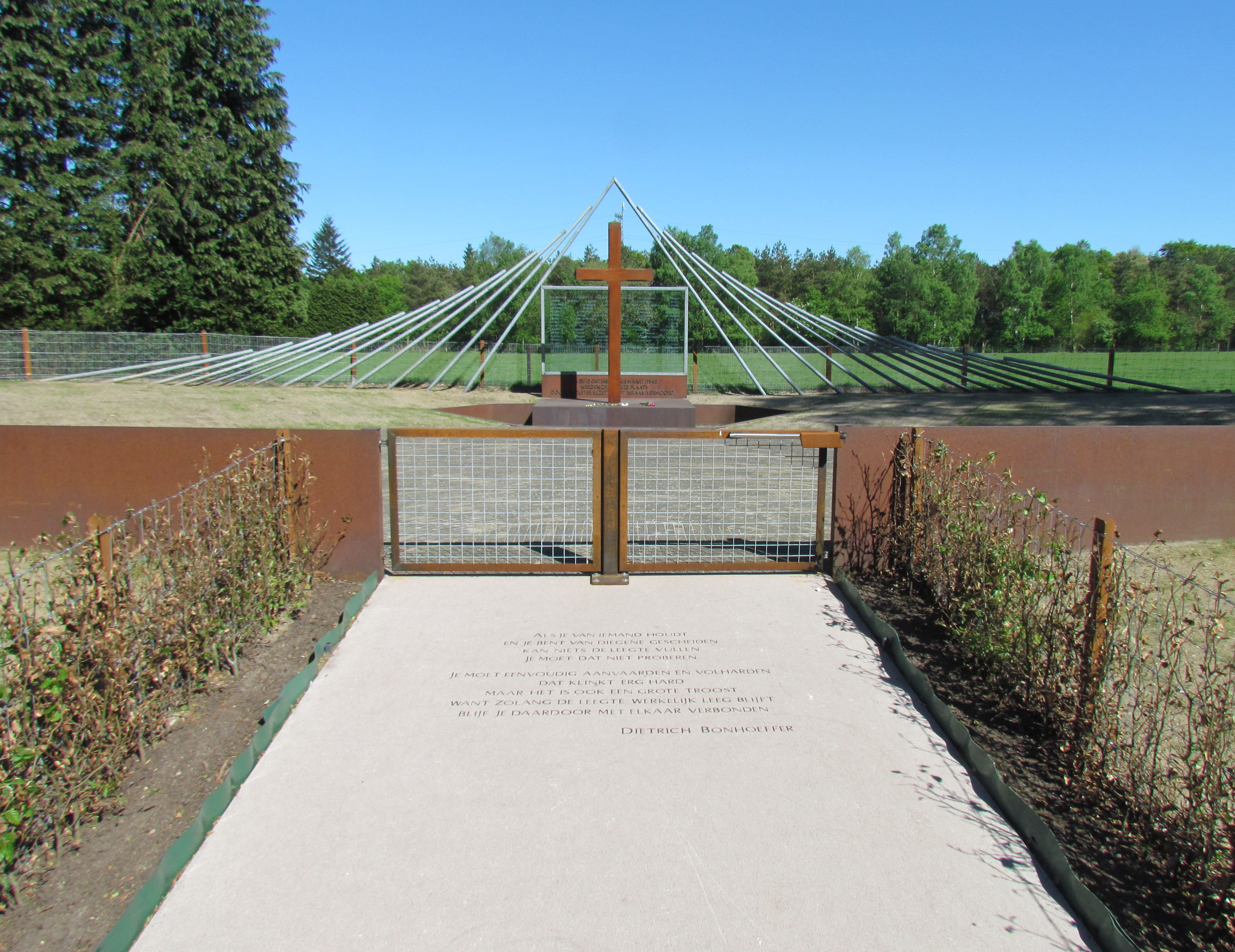
De Woeste Hoeve - memorial for the executed, made by Tirza Verrips

Dressed in German uniforms, the resistance group thought they could hear the truck approaching and went out on the road to halt the vehicle. However, it turned out not to be a truck but Rauter's car. When they realised their mistake, they shot the three people inside, Rauter, an SS officer and the driver. They thought they had killed all three and ran off.

Rauter, who managed to survive the attack, was discovered a few hours later and taken to hospital in Apeldoorn where he recovered.

As a result, huge reprisals were taken under the command of SS Brigadefuhrer Dr. Karl Eberhard Schöngarth on 8 March. At Woeste Hoeve itself, 116 men were rounded up and shot on the spot and another 147 prisoners of the Gestapo were executed at a number of other locations. A German soldier who refused to take part in the Woeste Hoeve massacre was also shot and buried with the Dutch victims.

Rauter was later captured by soldiers of the British Army, who turned him over to the Dutch. He was sentenced to death on 4 May 1948 and executed by firing squad at Scheveningen on 25 March 1949. Schöngarth was executed by the British for other crimes on 16 May 1946.
