= Meindert Wiardi Beckman =

Dutch politician and judge

Meindert Wiardi Beckman (16 January 1795, Amsterdam – 8 April 1863, The Hague) was a Dutch politician and judge.

Wiardi Beckman was a member of the municipal council of Amsterdam and Minister of Religious Affairs in the Van der Brugghen cabinet.

He is the great-grandfather of SDAP Senator Herman Bernard Wiardi Beckman.
