= Hanns Albin Rauter =

Austrian-born Higher SS and Police Leader, SS-Obergruppenführer

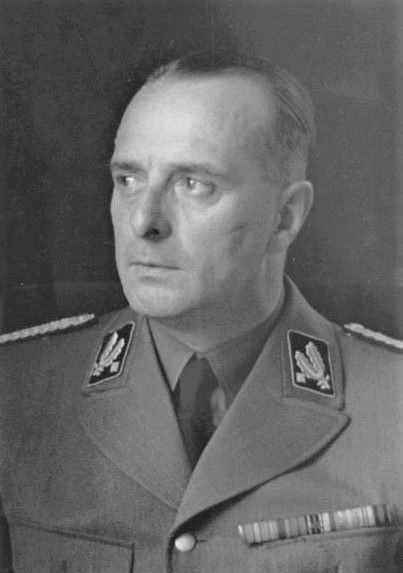
- Rauter in 1939
- Born: 4 February 1895; Klagenfurt, Austro-Hungarian Empire
- Died: 24 March 1949 (aged 54); Near Scheveningen, Netherlands
- Military career
- Allegiance: German Empire; Nazi Germany
- Branch: Imperial German Army; Freikorps; Schutzstaffel
- Service years: 1914–1919; 1921; 1935–1945
- Rank: SS-Obergruppenführer und General der Polizei
- Commands: Higher SS and Police Leader of the Netherlands (1940–1945)
- Conflicts: World War I World War II

Johann Baptist Albin Rauter (4 February 1895 – 24 March 1949) was a high-ranking Austrian-born SS functionary and war criminal during the Nazi era. He was the Higher SS and Police Leader in the occupied Netherlands and therefore the leading security and police officer there during the period of 1940–1945. Rauter reported directly to the Nazi SS chief, Heinrich Himmler, and also to the Nazi Reichskommissar of the Netherlands, Arthur Seyss-Inquart. After World War II, Rauter was convicted in the Netherlands of crimes against humanity and executed by firing squad.

== Early life and career ==
Born in Klagenfurt, Rauter graduated from high school in 1912 and started training as an engineer at the Graz University of Technology. At the outbreak of World War I Rauter volunteered for service in the Austro-Hungarian Army. He served with a Gebirgsschützenregiment and was discharged in 1919, having reached the rank of Oberleutnant. Rauter took part in the Austro-Slovene conflict in Carinthia, and from May until July 1921 he fought in the Freikorps Oberland in Oberschlesien. For his service during the war, Rauter received several decorations including Austrian Military Merit Cross 3rd Class with War decoration, Silver Medal for Bravery, Wound Medal or Karl Troop Cross.

Rauter first met Adolf Hitler in August 1926 in Munich. He joined the Nazi cause in Austria in November 1931. His forays in Austria forced him to flee to Germany in July 1933, where he became part of the Nazi Party department for Austria. He joined the Sturmabteilung (SA) on 23 November 1933, was assigned to SA-Obergruppe XI, and was active in planning illegal activities in Austria. He was confirmed in the rank of SA-Obersturmbannführer in November 1934. On 27 February 1935, he transferred from the SA to become a member of the SS (SS number 262,958) and was granted the rank of SS-Oberführer. Rauter became a German citizen on 7 May 1935. From April to June 1936, he was posted to the SS Main Office and, from June 1936 to November 1938, he was assigned to the staff of the Reichsführer-SS. From November 1938 to June 1940, he was the chief of staff of SS-Oberabschnitt Südost (Main District Southwest) in Breslau. On 27 October 1938, he was appointed to fill a vacancy as a Nazi deputy to the Reichstag from the recently renamed Ostmark.

== Actions in the occupied Netherlands ==
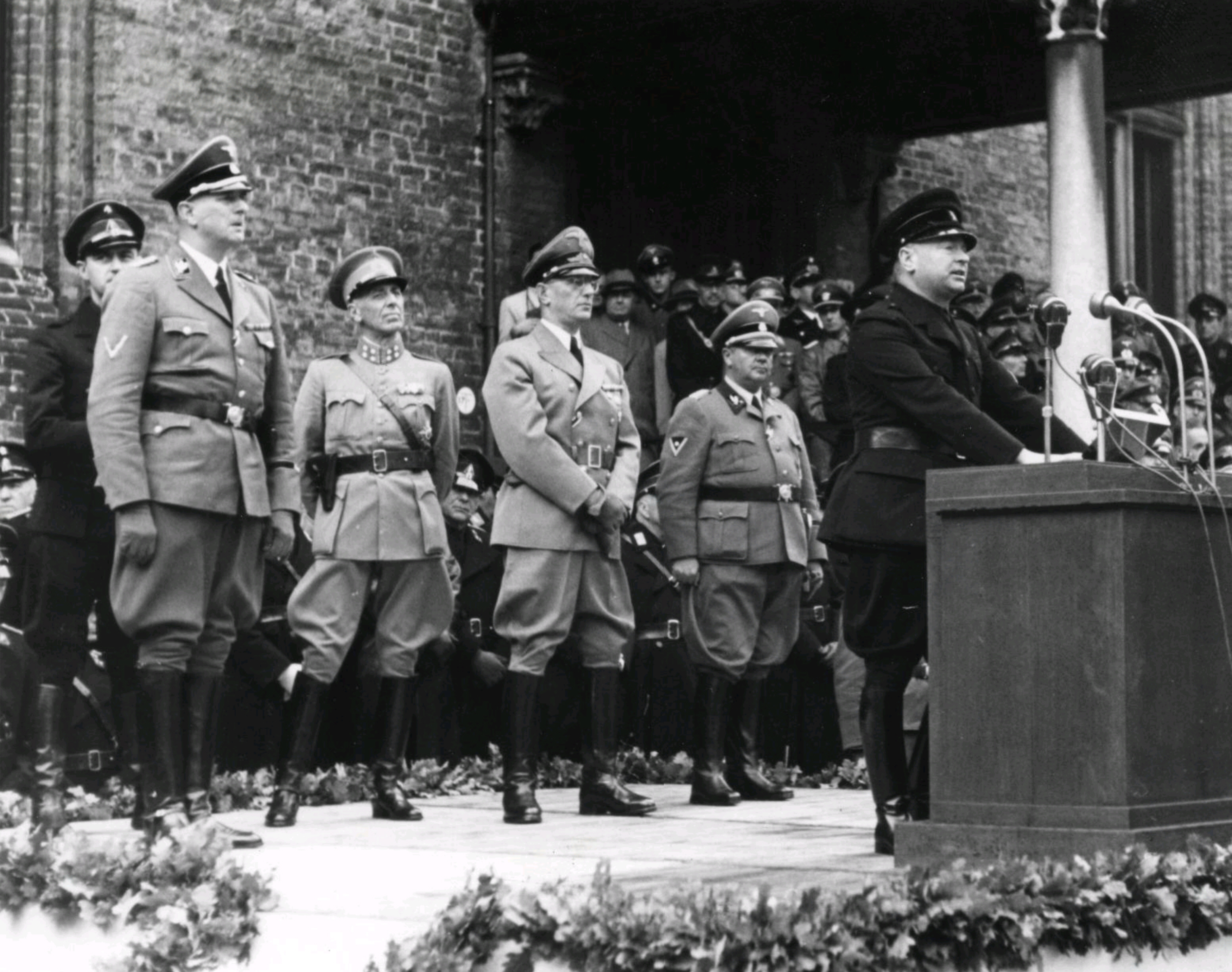
Dutch puppet leader Anton Mussert speaking to NSB recruits with Reich Commissioner Arthur Seyss-Inquart, General Hendrik Seyffardt and Rauter to the rear; The Hague, October 1941

In May 1940, he was appointed Generalkommissar für das Sicherheitswesen (General Commissioner for Security) and Höherer SS-und Polizeiführer (Higher SS and Police leader) for the occupied Netherlands. In his position as police commander and highest ranking SS leader in the Netherlands, Rauter was responsible for the deportation of 110,000 Dutch Jews to the Nazi concentration camps (6,000 survived) and the repression of the Dutch resistance. He had 300,000 Dutchmen deported to Germany for forced labour. His first victims to die were those killed during the armed break up of the February strike on 26 February 1941, accounting for 9 dead that day: he also immediately declared a state of emergency and ordered summary executions.

He was the chief promoter of terror through summary arrests and internment in the Netherlands. The SS set up a concentration camp named Herzogenbusch after the city of 's-Hertogenbosch, but located in the neighboring town of Vught that gave the camp its name: Kamp Vught. In total this camp detained 31,000 people, of whom some 735 were killed. Also, his SS manned a so-called polizeiliches Durchgangslager or police transit camp near Amersfoort, known as Kamp Amersfoort, in fact also a concentration camp, where some 35,000 people were detained and maltreated and 650 people (Dutch and Russian) died. Rauter's SS also managed the Kamp Westerbork (polizeiliches Durchgangslager Westerbork), the place from which some 110,000 Dutch Jews were deported to Nazi concentration and extermination camps, mainly Auschwitz and Sobibor.

Under Rauter's guidance, a special block was built for 'political prisoners' (i.e. resistance workers) in the Scheveningen prison. These were often held in indefinite detention. In total 28,000 people were detained here over 4 years; many were severely mistreated, some were tried and 738 men and 21 women died here or on the nearby execution field, the Waalsdorpervlakte (now a national place of remembrance).

Rauter also instigated a system of retaliation for assaults on Nazi officials and their Dutch collaborators: one killed Nazi equalled ten Dutch victims, one killed Dutch collaborator equalled three Dutch victims. During 1944 these numbers sharply increased with the rise of resistance violence.

During the Allied assault on Arnhem in Operation Market Garden, Rauter took the active field command of the Kampfgruppe Rauter during operations in the Veluwe area and near the bridges over the IJssel river. Kampfgruppe Rauter consisted of the Landstorm Nederland, Wachbataillon Nordwest and a regiment of the Ordnungspolizei. After the assault on Arnhem had been fought off by the Germans, Rauter was given the command of the Maas front as a General in the Waffen-SS.

In the night of 6–7 March 1945 he was severely wounded by an attack staged by the Dutch resistance at Woeste Hoeve on the Veluwe, a small village between Arnhem and Apeldoorn. In a reprisal organised by SS-Brigadeführer Karl Eberhard Schöngarth, the Germans executed 117 political prisoners at the location of the attack as well as 50 prisoners in Kamp Amersfoort and 40 prisoners each in The Hague and Rotterdam—a total of 263 persons were killed. This attack had not been planned; the resistance merely wanted to hijack a truck and use it to drive to a farmer who had butchered cows for the German army. Instead of the truck, Rauter's BMW motorcar was stopped by members of the resistance dressed in German uniforms. However, Rauter had just two weeks earlier issued a directive stating that German patrols should not stop any German military vehicles outside towns or villages, and a firefight broke out. His fellow passengers were all killed, but Rauter feigned death and survived. He was found by a German military patrol and transferred to a hospital where he remained until his arrest by British Military Police after the end of hostilities.

== After the war ==
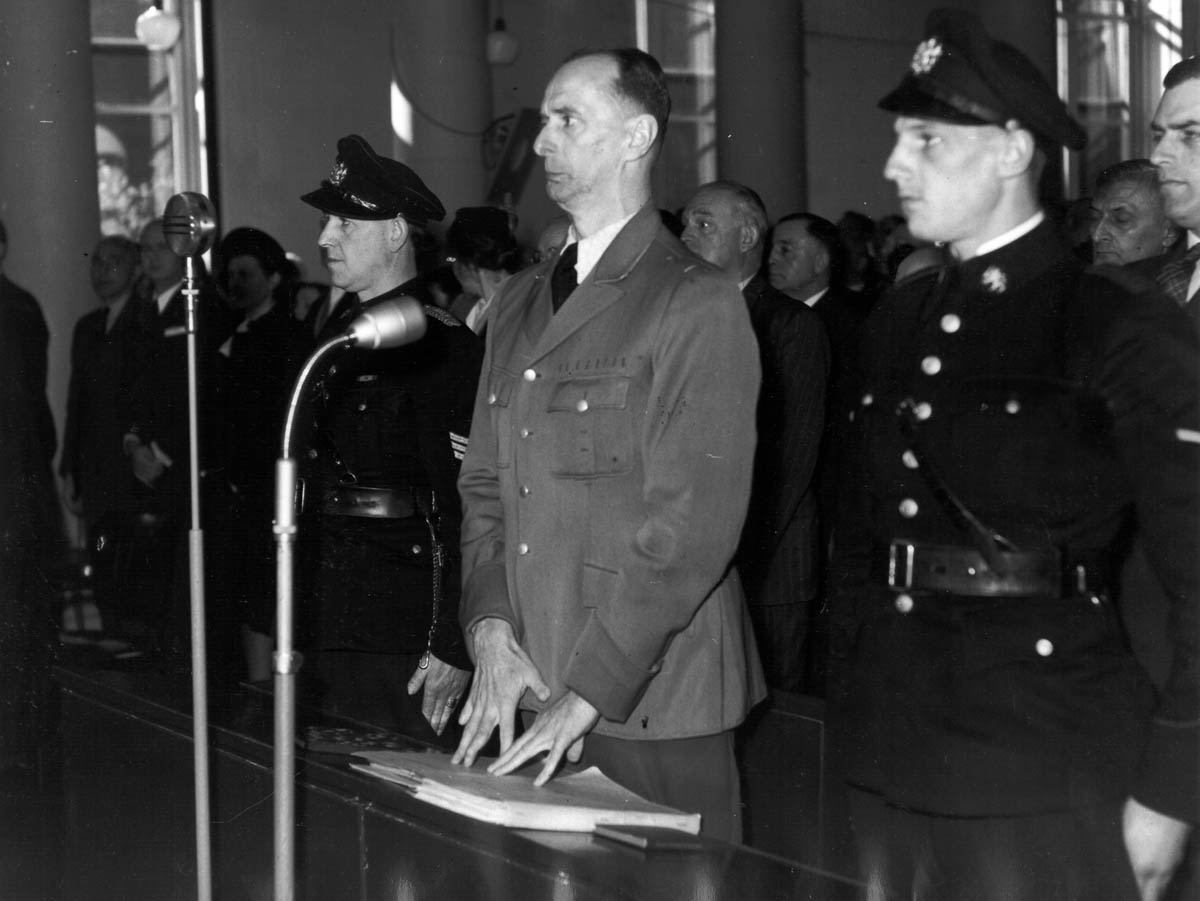
Rauter on trial at The Hague in 1948

Rauter was handed over to the Dutch government by the British and was tried by a special court in The Hague. Rauter denied committing war crimes, but the court found him guilty and sentenced him to death. A film record was made of the trial.

The death sentence was confirmed by a higher court on 12 January 1949, and Rauter was executed by firing squad near Scheveningen on 24 March 1949. The location of his grave remains a state secret.

== Sources ==
- Williams, Max (2018). SS Elite: The Senior Leaders of Hitler's Praetorian Guard. Vol. 3. Fonthill Media LLC. ISBN 978-1-781-55638-2.
