= Geeste =

Geeste can mean the following:

- Geeste, Emsland, a village in Lower Saxony, Germany
- Geeste (river), one of the tributaries of the Weser River in Germany
