= Scholtenhuis =

- Scholtenshuis
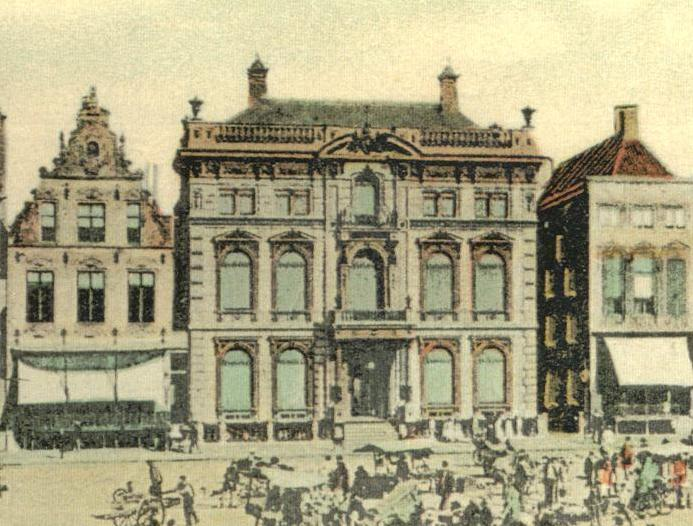

General information
- Status: Destroyed in 1945
- Type: Townhouse
- Architectural style: Eclectic
- Location: Grote Markt, Groningen, Netherlands
- Construction started: 1878
- Completed: 1881
- Destroyed: 1945
- Client: Willem Albert Scholten

Design and construction
- Architect: Jan Maris

The Scholtenhuis (or Scholtenshuis) was a well-known and infamous building located in the centre of Groningen, the Netherlands, on the eastern side of the Grote Markt. It was constructed between 1878 and 1881 in an eclectic style by the Groningen architect Jan Maris for the industrialist Willem Albert Scholten. The property consisted of two connected houses occupied by two generations of the Scholten family: W.A. Scholten and his son Jan Evert Scholten. Of the original complex, only the former carriage house with chauffeur's apartment at Martinikerkhof 8 remains, featuring an “S” above the entrance referring to the Scholten family.

== History ==
=== Construction ===
“Rieke” (Groningen dialect for “rich”) Scholten wished to live in style in Groningen and had his eye on several houses on the Grote Markt, which were still occupied. A carpenter was sent to inform the residents that there was an interested buyer. The message caused surprise among the ladies Van Imhoff, annoyance with Jonkheer Alberda van Ekenstein, and a third owner refused outright to sell. Scholten then chose a location on the corner of the Gelkingestraat further south and waited patiently until the previous owners passed away. He then bought and demolished the old buildings and constructed his grand residence. From this vantage point, Scholten had a view of both the Grote Markt and the city hall of Groningen. Because he wanted to know the wind direction, he had a weathervane installed on the city hall, visible from his house.

=== Second World War ===
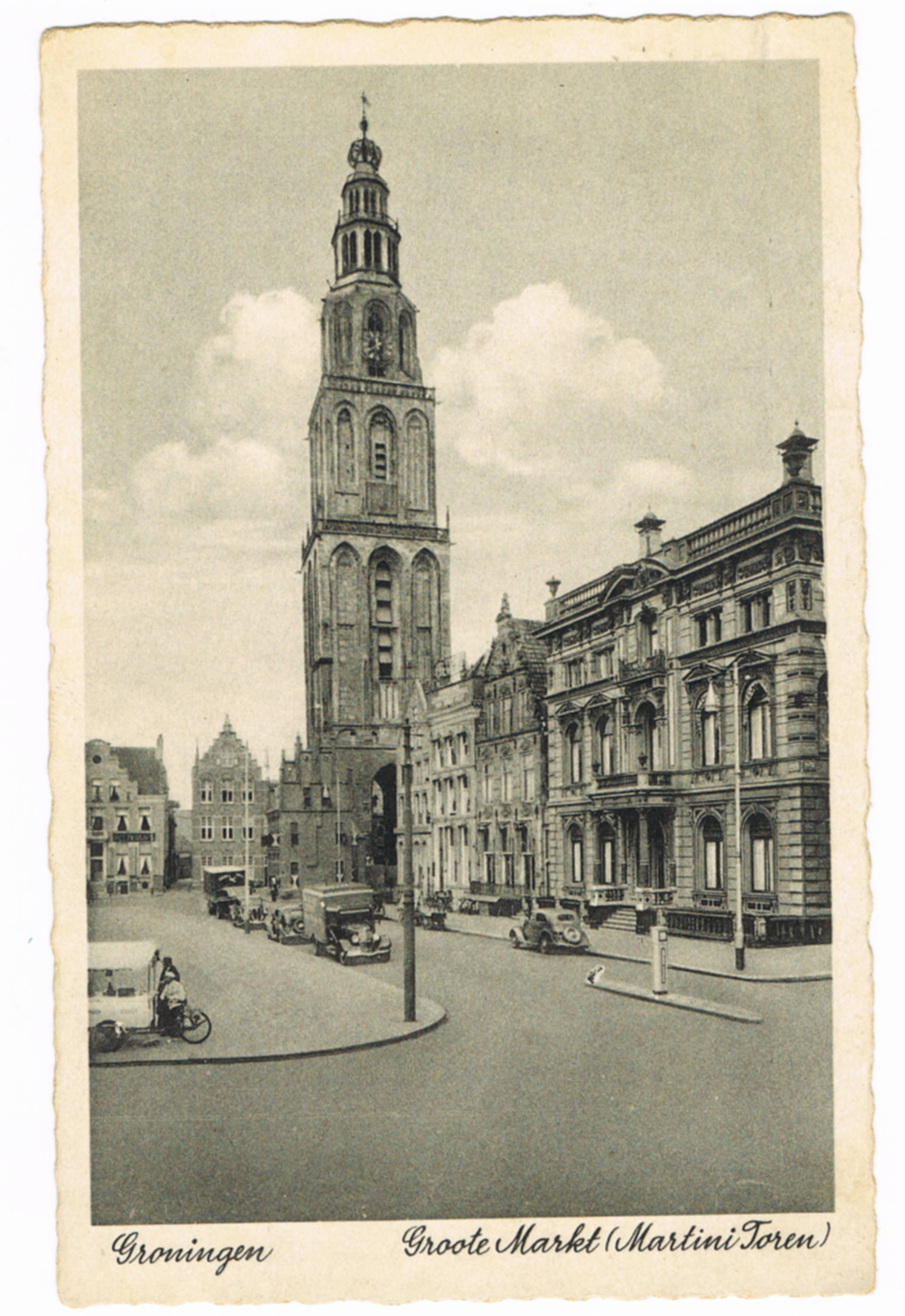
Scholtenhuis, 1930s

The Scholtenhuis became notorious during the Second World War. In June 1940, the widow of Jan Evert Scholten, Geessien Mulder, and her youngest son Johan Bernhard were evicted. The building was seized by the German occupation authorities and became one of six Dutch Aussenstelle offices—regional headquarters of the Sicherheitsdienst and the Sicherheitspolizei.

Under the command of, among others, the feared SD officer Robert Lehnhoff, hundreds of resistance fighters were arrested, interrogated, and brutally tortured in the building. Many were later executed at remote sites. The Scholtenhuis thus became known locally as the “vestibule of hell.” During the liberation of Groningen in April 1945, the building was set on fire, shelled, and completely destroyed.

The perpetrators of the Scholtenhuis were responsible for the deaths of more than 473 people, including those sent to concentration camps and never returned. This number excludes deported Jewish citizens. Soil from the location of the Scholtenhuis is included in the Groningen urn of the National Monument in Amsterdam.

==== Notable German SD officers ====
- Bernard Georg Haase – commander of SD-Aussenstelle Groningen
- Friedrich Bellmer – deputy commander
- Emil Schuchmann – head of Sicherheitsdienst department III
- Dr. Ernst Knorr – head of Sicherheitspolizei department IV-A
- Robert Lehnhoff – head of Sicherheitspolizei department IV-B
- Jozef Kindel – officer, department IV-B
- Helmuth Johann Schäper – officer, department IV-A

==== Dutch collaborators ====
- Harm Bouman – sentenced to 22 years (expressed deep remorse)
- Evert Drost – executed
- Oomke Bouman – executed
- Eppe Steenwijk – Groningen police officer, sentenced to 15 years
- Pieter Johan Faber – executed
- Abraham Kaper – executed
- Klaas Carel Faber – sentenced to life imprisonment, escaped in 1952, died 24 May 2012 in Ingolstadt, Germany
- Peter Schaap – executed
- Zacharias Sleijfer – died in a psychiatric institution

== After the war ==
Reconstruction on the site did not begin until 1954, when the student society building Mutua Fides was built for the Groningen student corps Vindicat atque Polit. The building line on the eastern side of the Grote Markt was moved about twenty metres back, making the original position of the Scholtenhuis difficult to recognise. The new buildings included shops and the Naberpassage, named after resistance fighter Caspar Naber, who was arrested there in 1944 and committed suicide to avoid betraying others under torture.

A memorial plaque was placed at the site bearing the poem:

Scholtenshuis 1940–1945
Here stood the house of Nazism,
of swastika and of SS,
Here they gave Germanic lessons
in ghastly sadism.
Here those who fought for freedom
suffered inhumanly.

Since April 2009, a virtual tour of the Scholtenhuis has been available online, including films, photographs, and interviews, created under the supervision of the Oorlogs- en Verzetscentrum Groningen (War and Resistance Centre Groningen).

The exact site of the Scholtenhuis has since been completely redeveloped with the construction of the Market Hotel. In 2021, the temporarily removed memorial plaque was reinstated in the side wall of the hotel, located on the new Naberstraat. The hotel restaurant is named “Willem Albert” after the original builder.
