= Binnenlandse Strijdkrachten =

Former union of Dutch resistance groups

Instructions from Prince Bernhard after the creation of the BS, 11 September 1944, Radio Oranje

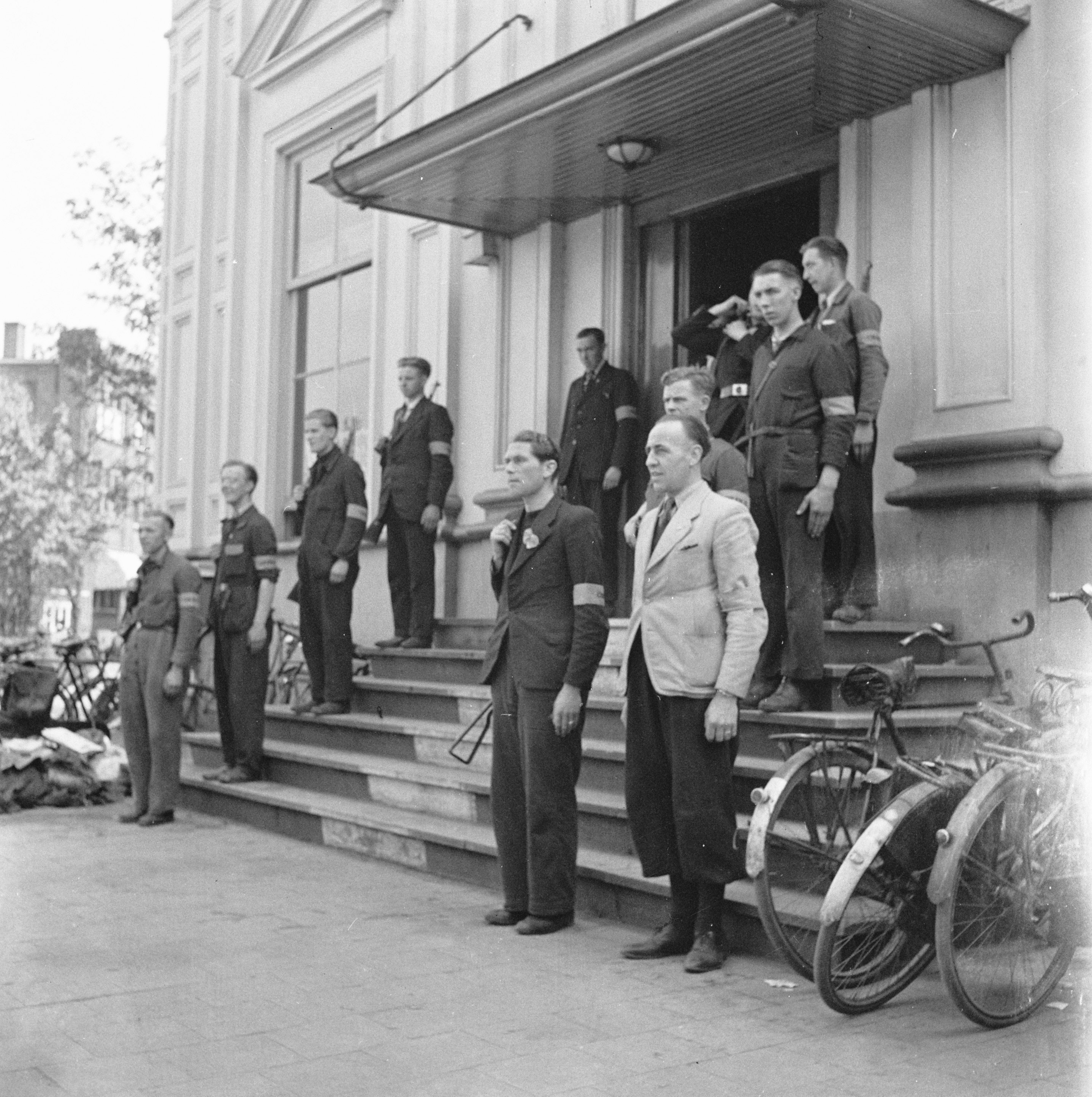
Men of the Binnenlandse Strijdkrachten, armed with rifles and STENs, form a guard of honor for a visit by Prince Bernhard, April 1945.

The Binnenlandse Strijdkrachten (BS; English: 'Domestic Armed Forces'), fully the Nederlandse Binnenlandse Strijdkrachten (NBS), was a government-sanctioned union of Dutch resistance groups during the German occupation of the Netherlands in World War II, which had hardly cooperated until then.

== History ==
Until 1944 the resistance groups, insofar as they were in contact, worked independently under the supervision of the Bureau Bijzondere Opdrachten (BBO, 'Office of Special Assignments') of the Dutch government-in-exile in London. When they were merged into the Binnenlandse Strijdkrachten, Prince Bernhard of Lippe-Biesterfeld was appointed commander of this new organization, although he remained in London. The commander of the BS in the occupied Netherlands was Colonel Henri Koot, who was in Amsterdam.

At the time the groups were united, they had less than 10,000 members between them. They were also very poorly armed, though this would improve following Allied weapon drops.

The full name of the organization was the Nederlandse Binnenlandse Strijdkrachten (NBS). The short form of the name was preferred, however, not least because the full abbreviation resembled that of the collaborationist National Socialist Movement in the Netherlands, the NSB.

The BS was created in the image of the French Forces of the Interior and enjoyed great support from Queen Wilhelmina. The organization was divided into Stoottroepen ('Assault Forces') and Bewakingstroepen ('Guard Forces'). In the still occupied part of the Netherlands, the Stoottroepen were referred to as the Strijdend Gedeelte der BS (SG; 'Combatant Division of the BS'). The men of the Stoottroepen had to come from the armed resistance. The Bewakingstroepen were made up of "those who have made themselves available to maintain or restore order and peace on the day of liberation and thereafter." They would only take to the streets after the liberation. So for the time being they were little more than members-in-waiting.

The BS was founded partly to keep the armed resistance movement manageable, especially now that it would be supplied with weapons on a large scale. The organization was bound by all sorts of rules. For example, members of the BS were only allowed to appear publicly as an army if the commander (Prince Bernhard) gave the signal. The union of the three armed resistance groups also did not mean that those groups were immediately absorbed into the new organization. The differences between them proved too great for that.

Regular top meetings took place between the three groups under the code name "Delta-Center." "Commander Delta" was Colonel Koot. In September 1944, the OD brought in 4,000 men, the LKP 1,800 men, the RVV 1,000 men.

Members of the BS wore blue boilersuits as their uniform.

From September 1944 to May 1945, a total of 1,730 members of the organization were killed. The BS experienced tremendous growth from October 1944 on. That great influx started in the liberated southern provinces.

In May 1945 there were 150,000 to 200,000 members of the BS throughout the Netherlands. The entire resistance was estimated to have no more than 25,000 (in 1943) to 45,000 (1944-1945) participants.

Neither the Germans nor the Allies thought highly of the BS. The organization expected to stand "shoulder-to-shoulder" with Allied soldiers to "whip the krauts", but the Allies concluded an armistice with the Germans on 4 May 1945, which included the condition that only Allied units would disarm the Germans, and not the BS. This effectively made the Binnenlandse Strijdkrachten redundant. The Allies then forbade members of the organization from appearing armed in public, because they feared chaos would break out and BS men would lynch Germans. The organization did not comply with this ban, which, according to researchers, has led, among other things, to violence such as the 7 May shooting on Dam Square in Amsterdam.

== Structure ==
The BS originated from the three main resistance groups:

- The Ordedienst (OD; 'Order Service') was politically conservative and military in character; officers of the Netherlands Armed Forces were active in the OD. The OD was not founded as a resistance organization in the summer of 1940, but as a precaution: to maintain order in the transition period between occupation and liberation. Later in the war, many like-minded people joined them, such as members of the middle class and students. The OD started doing more and more resistance work, such as arranging hiding addresses (LO) and a lot of espionage work. Positions and ammunition depots of the Wehrmacht were placed under observation. The OD had an extensive communication network through secret transmitters and couriers.
- The Landelijke Organisatie voor Hulp aan Onderduikers/Landelijke Knokploegen (LO/LKP; 'National Organization for Aid to Persons-in-hiding/National Assault Squads') was confessional - based on faith and church, especially Reformed/Protestant, with branches in the Catholic south of the Netherlands. The LKP started out as a provider of support to the LO for those in hiding, for example by raiding distribution offices to obtain ration stamps for them.
- The Raad van Verzet (RVV; 'Resistance Council') was secular and politically progressive. On the Council itself was only one communist, Gerben Wagenaar; more communists were active in the RVV groups. The Council wanted to start a "real guerrilla" against the occupying forces and could find agreement within the LKP. There was a world of difference between the RVV and the OD, however. The Ordedienst distrusted the Council because of its communist influence and it did not seem entirely unlikely to OD leadership that the communists would try to revolt and seize power during a power vacuum in the wake of liberation.

Because there was a post-war shortage of former resistance fighters, many other (young) men without loyalties to any group were also able to join the BS after the war.

In Leiden, the BS had a contingent of Indonesian students loyal to the Perhimpoenan Indonesia. Opeating under the name Groep Irawan, the resistance group was one of the few indonesian members who fought for the liberation of Indonesia and the Netherlands.

== Awards ==
Remembrance Badge

The Herinneringsinsigne Binnenlandse Strijdkrachten 1944-1945 (English: 'Domestic Armed Forces Remembrance Badge 1944-1945') was instituted after the war by Prince Bernhard of Lippe-Biesterfeld.

The disorganized or spontaneously organized Binnenlandse Strijdkrachten meritoriously performed many tasks and as commander of the BS, Prince Bernhard was appointed Commander in the Military Order of William, as befits the commander of a victorious army corps. There was no decoration or visible tribute to the men of the BS. They were ineligible for the Mobilisation War Cross or the War Commemorative Cross. The Resistance Memorial Cross would not be established until December 1980. Eligibility for the Mobilisation War Cross only followed when it was reestablished by Queen Beatrix on 1 October 1992.

== See also ==
- Dutch government-in-exile
- Dutch resistance and Dutch resistance members
- Free Dutch Forces
- French Forces of the Interior
