= Jewish women in the Holocaust =

Of the six million Jews killed during the Holocaust, two million were women. Between 1941 and 1945, Jewish women were imprisoned in Nazi concentration camps or hiding to avoid capture by the Nazis under Adolf Hitler's regime in Germany. They were also sexually harassed, raped, verbally abused, beaten, and used for Nazi human experimentation. Jewish women had a sizable and distinct role in the resistance and partisan groups.

== Social networks ==
According to author Joan Ringelheim, women demonstrated more nurturing interpersonal behavior in internment/concentration camps than their male counterparts, due to their unique qualities. However, men also created social support networks in the camps.

An interview with a Holocaust survivor named Rose described the bonds the women formed:

...[women were] picking each other like monkeys [for lice]… holding each other and keeping each other warm…. Someone puts their arm around and you remember…I think more women survived… the men were falling like flies. Men were friends there too. They talked to each other but they didn’t, wouldn’t sell their bread for an apple for the other guy. They wouldn’t sacrifice anything. See, that was the difference.

== Sexual abuse ==
Jewish women during the Holocaust were especially vulnerable to sexual abuse by their Nazi captors. Women were immediately violated upon entering as "the tattooing, the removal of their hair, the invasion of their body cavities" was part of a systematic process of degradation, humiliation, and commodification." Women's reproductive abilities were negatively impacted as a result of the genocidal conditions. Several women Holocaust survivors noted that they developed amenorrhea, which reduced their chances of having children. Rape was one of the major risks faced by women in the Holocaust. They were sometimes raped, then murdered. One SS officer was reported to have "had the custom of standing at the doorway… and feeling the private parts of the young women entering the gas bunker. There were also instances of SS men of all ranks pushing their fingers into the vaginas of pretty young women."

It was reported that "50%–80% of the SS troops and police units that operated in Eastern Europe were guilty of the sexual assault on Jewish women," not only for sexual pleasure but also to exert dominance and dehumanize them. This was in spite of the Nazi law that forbids sexual relations between ethnic Germans and Jews which was punishable by jail or death. There were instances of SS unit parties where defenseless Jewish women were repeatedly sexually assaulted until they fell to the floor bleeding. Some historians conclude that because most SS officers and soldiers were male, Jewish boys and men faced less risk of sexual assault and abuse than women.

Childbirth also endangered women's survival in the concentration camps, affecting them physically and emotionally. Once a baby was born, women were vulnerable to being killed along with their newborns. One memoir describes some of the sadistic acts: "SS men and women amuse themselves by beating pregnant women with clubs and whips, [having them] torn by dogs, dragged around by their hair and kicked in the stomach with heavy German boots. Then when [the pregnant Jewish women] collapsed, they were thrown into the crematory – alive." Rape, unwanted pregnancies, forced abortions, medical experimentation and/or examination, and sterilization were also common and contributed to the sexual violations and abuse many Jewish women faced during the Holocaust.

== Gender versus identity ==
=== Jewish women and motherhood ===
Major disparities between mother and father figures in the narratives of survivors were caused by the gender roles of Jewish men and women who were imprisoned. Women commonly referred to themselves as surrogate mothers and highlighted their unique qualities as women in describing their experiences in the camps. To them, being a woman in the Holocaust meant that they performed every role of a woman. They considered themselves as sisters, mothers, daughters, etc. Motherhood represented their gender, for they were continually worried about their children.

=== Jewish women as partisans ===
Jewish women faced challenges and played a role through their involvement in the Jewish partisan movement, a resistance movement against Nazi Germany throughout Nazi-occupied Europe in World War Two. These women escaped from Jewish ghettos throughout the occupied territory to join partisans in the forest to escape Nazi persecution and enhance their chances of survival. Many women successfully joined partisan units, specifically in the Bielski detachment. The Bielski detachment maintained the highest amount of female partisans, with approximately 364 women of the 1,018 members. However, partisan units were largely male, and military activities were the role of men. When women fled Nazi persecution to reach these units, they generally did so "because they were looking for a rescue, not because they were fighting the enemy."

The social cohesion of these partisan units sometimes reflected larger societal attitudes, including gendered stereotypes and expectations. The roles relegated to female members within were influenced by these factors. Subsequently, women who joined the partisans were generally "excluded from combat duty and from leadership positions" and subjected to gender-specific vulnerabilities. Research shows that many women were aware before entering the forest that "the possibility of rape or murder was real." Once accepted into the partisans, women were often pressured into relationships with men in these units, either willingly or unwillingly, due to the protection they granted to the women. However, under many circumstances, women were not subjected to discrimination and were regarded as valuable assets. Specifically in the Bielski detachment, women played a pivotal role in running the camp by providing food and aiding the injured or ill partisans as nurses or members of the medical staff.

=== Jewish women in the resistance ===
Both men and women were part of the resistance, but the role of women is often overlooked in present-day discussions. Women would sometimes be used to attract the attention of Nazis and lure them into an ambush or assassinate them personally. Some women also worked individually to support the resistance. Freddie Oversteegen and her older sister were 14 and 16 when they joined the Dutch resistance. The sisters met Hannie Schaft, and the three worked as a team to kill Nazi soldiers. Their young age allowed them to evade suspicion and exploit weaknesses in Nazi security. The trio primarily lured enemy soldiers into ambushes staged by older members of their partisan cell.

Niuta Teitelbaum, a 24-year-old Jewish woman nicknamed “Little Wanda with the braids”, and a graduate of Warsaw University, was a high-value target for the Gestapo. Teitelbaum would dress as a Polish farm girl and attempt to entice Nazi soldiers into a secluded location. Once the Nazi lowered his guard, Teitelbaum would kill him with a pistol. In one instance, Teitelbaum shot and killed two Nazis while injuring a third. Dissatisfied, she followed the wounded Nazi to a field hospital, entered the hospital disguised in a physician's coat, and killed both the Nazi guard and the police officer that was treating the man she had injured.

=== From Silence to Recognition: Confronting the Neglect of Jewish Women's Suffering During the Holocaust ===
Jewish women faced inconceivable brutality during the Holocaust that was not fully acknowledged until decades after the war. As noted above, Jewish women faced difficulties for not only being Jewish but for being women. Women were stripped of their dignity and identity through sexual assault, either directly or through murder. As recorded above, 50–80% of women experienced sexual violence, which speaks to how common this was. To further emphasize the severity of brutality they faced, mothers, and their children, were often killed after giving birth.

In Kerry Wallach and Sonia Gollance’s publication titled Feminist German Studies, their introduction focuses on the intersection of Antisemitism and Feminism, writing: “[s]ince at least the Middle Ages, representations of Jews have generally focused on Jewish men. Misogyny both within and outside of Jewish communities has placed men in the foreground. In many cases, Jewish women are simply absent or effaced from the record. Indeed, Jewishness has usually been coded as male.” Wallach and Gollance note that this is a consistent occurrence where events affecting women are neglected. They continue to write: "Even when Vergangenheitsbewältigung (coming to terms with the past) entered the German mainstream in the 1980s, activist projects and scholarly conversations often excluded Jewish women." To further prove that women's hardships were ignored during the Holocaust, Wallach and Gollance write: "In the 2004 twentieth-anniversary retrospective on their edited volume, When Biology Became Destiny, Renate Bridenthal, Atina Grossmann, and Kaplan point to inspirational work by the collective Frauengruppe Faschismusforschung (Women’s Group for Fascism Research) that, despite its pioneering efforts, notably omitted articles on Jewish women and the Holocaust (603)."

Excluding and ultimately ignoring Jewish Women's experiences during the Holocaust exposes historical biases. World War II scholars, researchers, and other academics need to ensure that these facts are integrated into the detailed narrative of the Holocaust to teach future generations the importance of recognizing the full story.

== Jewish women in labour camps ==
Many women believed that labour camps were an opportunity to work for their freedom from the ghettos, but other women attempted to escape. The conditions of the camps were much more brutal than commonly believed. Rena Kornreich Gelissen remembers telling herself “We are young…we will work hard and be set free.” Gelissen, who went into a labor camp willingly, unaware of their actual nature, said this was her original conception of a labor camp. Inside the camps, the reality became apparent. The women were stripped of their clothes, their belongings, and their hair. “They shear our heads, arms; even our pubic hair is discarded just as quickly and cruelly as the rest of the hair on our bodies.”

=== Selections ===
The main goal of the Holocaust was to eliminate the Jews. However, the Nazi regime maintained a large population of Jewish workers in the labor camps. To facilitate the Nazi goal of Jewish genocide, the labor camps conducted "selections," held at random intervals. Women were lined up to be killed or spared, largely at random. Gelissen said, "Selections are sporadic. There is no telling how often they occur…" she also goes on to say "There is usually one SS man who stands in judgment while the rest of them watch, and sometimes there is two SS man, both must give you the thumb toward life."

=== Diet ===
According to Gelissen, "if the war is going well for the Germans, once in a while [they] get a slice of meat in [their] soup or with [their] bread," and “we lick our open palms slowly, savoring the smear of margarine or mustard.” Apart from these small portions daily, they got morning tea, soup for lunch, and bread for dinner. However, most of the time they simply had water and less of what it actually was supposed to be. They were always hungry and wanted more. "I don’t know which to long for more – food or freedom.”

=== Work ===
Work in the labor camps was intense, due to harsh weather conditions and constant supervision by the SS. Prisoners often conducted manual labor in full sun, "when it was hot on [their] heads.” Gelissen performed many different jobs in the camps. She said the physical pain was incomparable to anything she had experienced. “We are working on the new blocks, digging sand out of a deep hole and shifting it through the mesh nets.” However, Rena had had experience doing this and she says, “Our hands are hard. They no longer bleed from the long hours of work….”
