= Hanneke Ippisch =

Dutch resistance member

Hanneke A. Ippisch-Eikema
- Born: 23 March 1925; Benningbroek, Netherlands
- Died: 15 April 2012 (aged 87); Missoula, Montana, U.S.
- Other names: "Ellie", "Miep"
- Occupation: Dutch resistance worker
- Years active: 1944–1945
- Notable work: Sky: a True Story of Courage during World War II

Hanneke Eikema (23 March 1925 – 15 April 2012) was a Dutch woman who, during World War II, helped ferry Jewish children to safety and assisted in the financial logistics of the Dutch resistance.

== Biography ==
Eikema, the daughter of a Protestant minister who was himself involved with the resistance, was born in Benningbroek and grew up in Zaandam. After she saw one of her classmates and the classmate's family get arrested and deported, she began ferrying Jewish children to safety in Friesland (by train, and on the Veerdienst Enkhuizen – Stavoren, the Enkhuizen-Stavoren ferry), under the nickname "Ellie". She joined the resistance proper in 1944 and, now named "Miep", became the personal courier for Walraven van Hall, leader and banker of the movement, entrusted with carrying large amounts of money and arranging meetings of senior resistance members.

Following information obtained under torture from Teus van Vliet, who himself had been betrayed by the Dutch collaborator Johan van Lom, Eikema, along with van Hall and four other senior members of the resistance, was arrested on 27 January 1945 in Amsterdam, on the Leidsegracht. She was interrogated in the prison on the Amstelveenseweg, by Emil Rühl. Van Hall was executed a few weeks later, but Eikema survived the war.

Eikema moved to Sweden, and married Frederick Rappe, a member of the nobility, with whom she emigrated to America. Her husband, a biochemist, got a job at the University of California, Berkeley, and they settled in the San Francisco Bay area, where she worked as an art teacher and ran a Dutch restaurant. Later the family (by then with four children) moved to Montana, and Eikema divorced her Swedish husband and married an American, Les Ippisch. She began a bed and breakfast, and gave lectures and wrote about her war experiences. She also wrote a number of books for children, including Sky: a True Story of Courage during World War II; the title (Sky) was derived from the view of the sky from her prison window on the Amstelveenseweg. She died at age 87 of Alzheimer's disease, in Missoula, Montana.
