= Overveen =

- Village
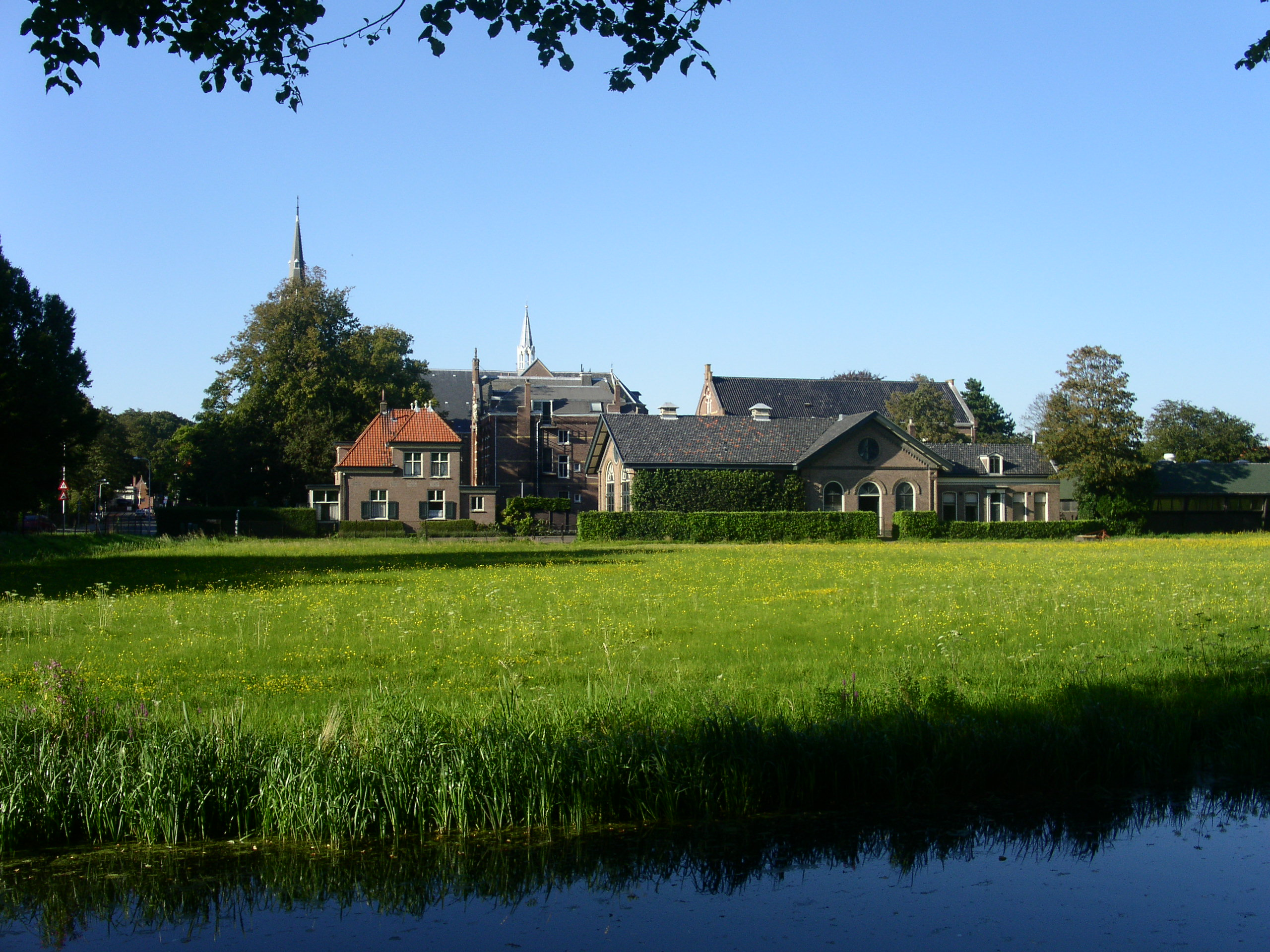
- Overveen

- Location in the Netherlands Location in the province of North Holland in the Netherlands
- Coordinates: 52°23′32″N 4°37′3″E
- Country: Netherlands
- Province: North Holland
- Municipality: Bloemendaal

Area
  - Total: 4.22 km^{2} (1.63 sq mi)
- Elevation: 4.2 m (14 ft)

Population (2021)
  - Total: 4,390
  - Density: 1,040/km^{2} (2,690/sq mi)
- Time zone: UTC+1 (CET)
  - Summer (DST): UTC+2 (CEST)
- Postal code: 2051
- Dialing code: 023

Overveen is a village in North Holland in the Netherlands, in the municipality of Bloemendaal. Overveen lies on the eastern fringe of the North Sea dunes. To the east it borders the built-up areas of Haarlem. A few kilometres to the west of the town lies the Erebegraafplaats Bloemendaal (Honorary Cemetery), where many Second World War victims have been reburied, including resistance fighter Hannie Schaft, sculptor and resistance leader Gerrit van der Veen, banker and resistance member Walraven van Hall, Physician and former Wehrmacht officer Karl Gröger, and sculptor and resistance member Johan Limpers. The town is connected to rail service by the Overveen railway station which opened in 1881 on the Haarlem to Zandvoort railway line.

== Landmarks ==
Lonbar Petrilaan 28, in the Kweekduin neighborhood, was built in 1956-57 by noted Dutch architect Gerard Holt. Its garden, designed by Mien Ruys, was the first bielzentuin in the Netherlands. The house is on the list of municipal monuments.

== Gallery ==
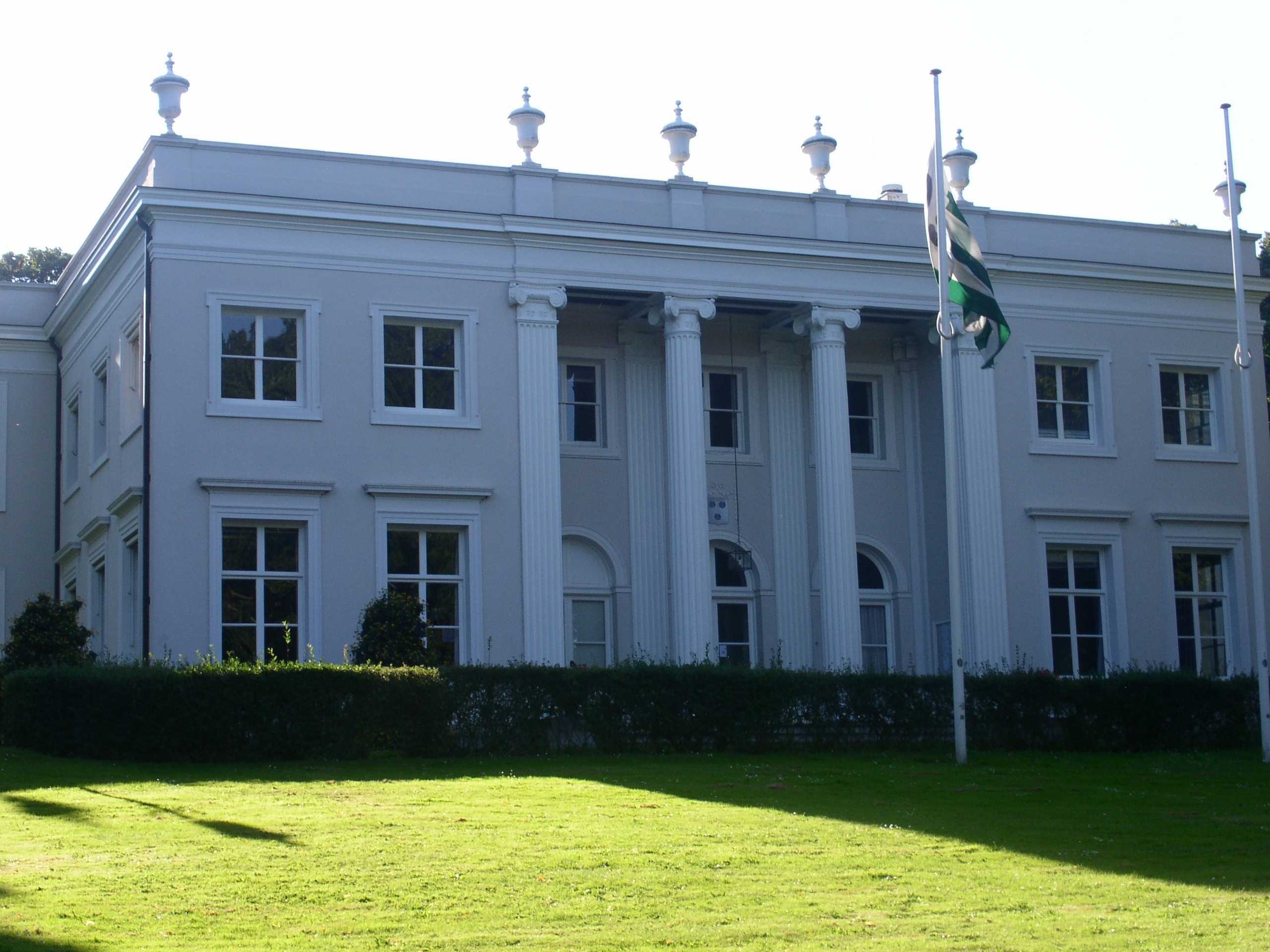
The Bloemendaal town hall in Overveen

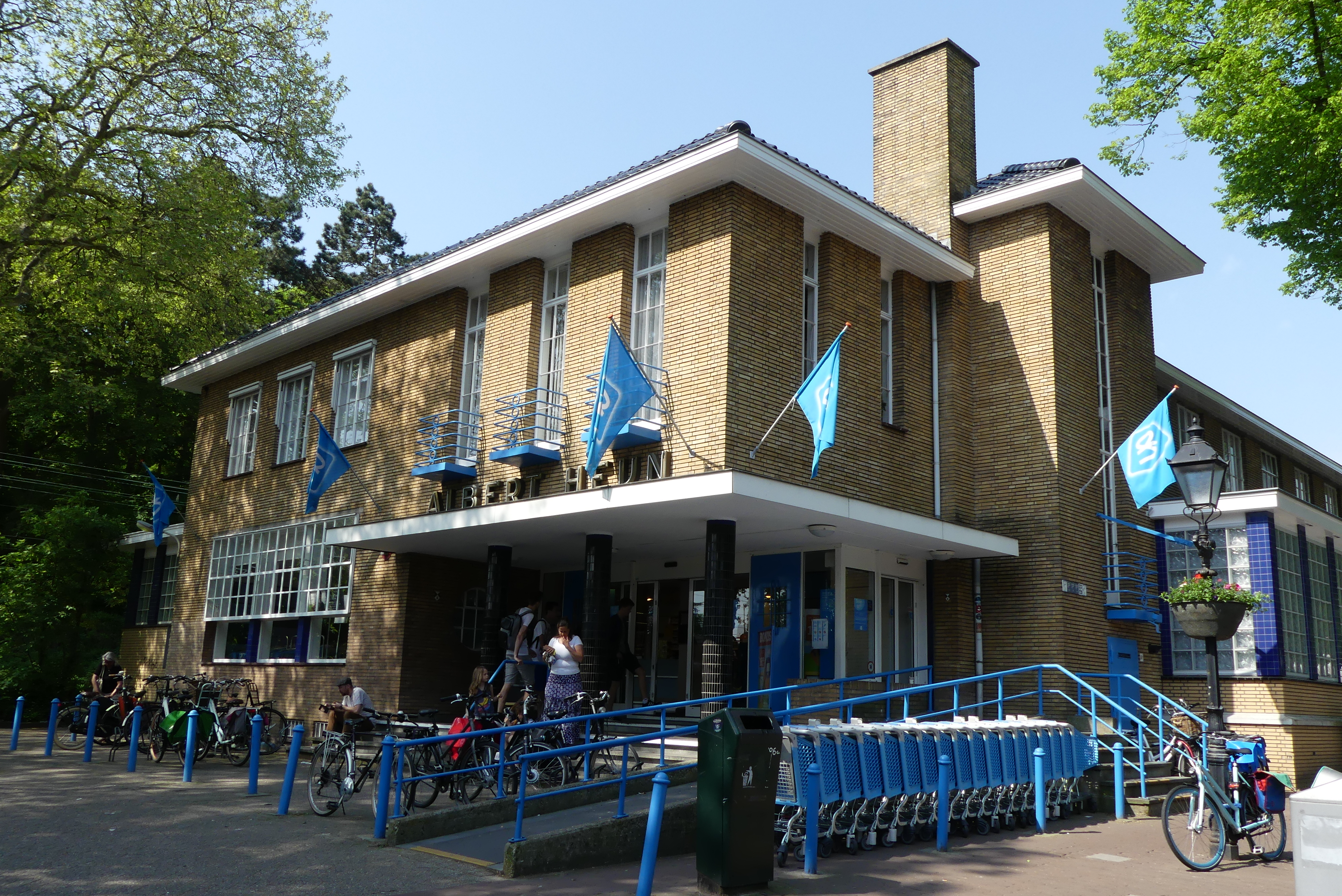
Supermarket

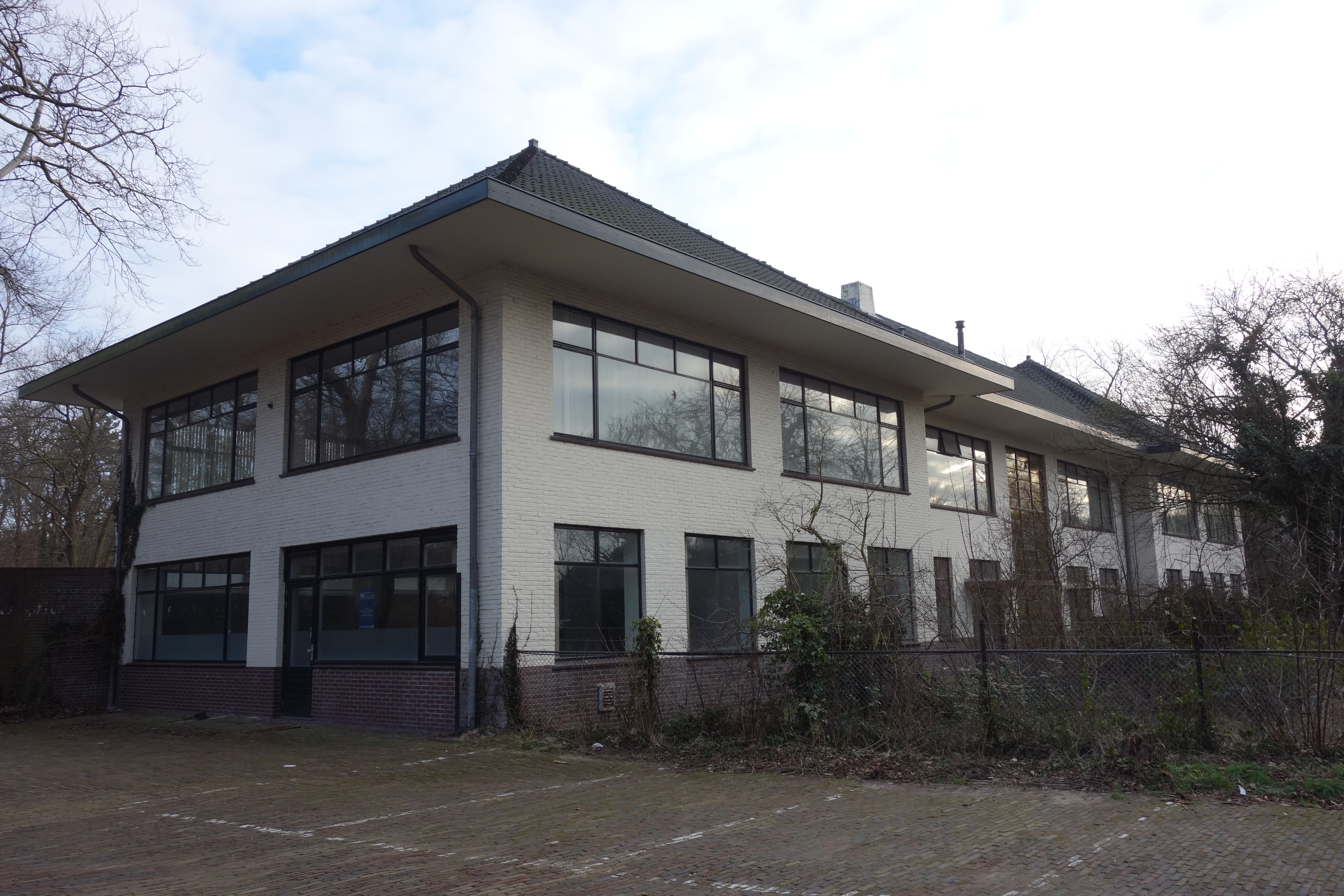
Office building

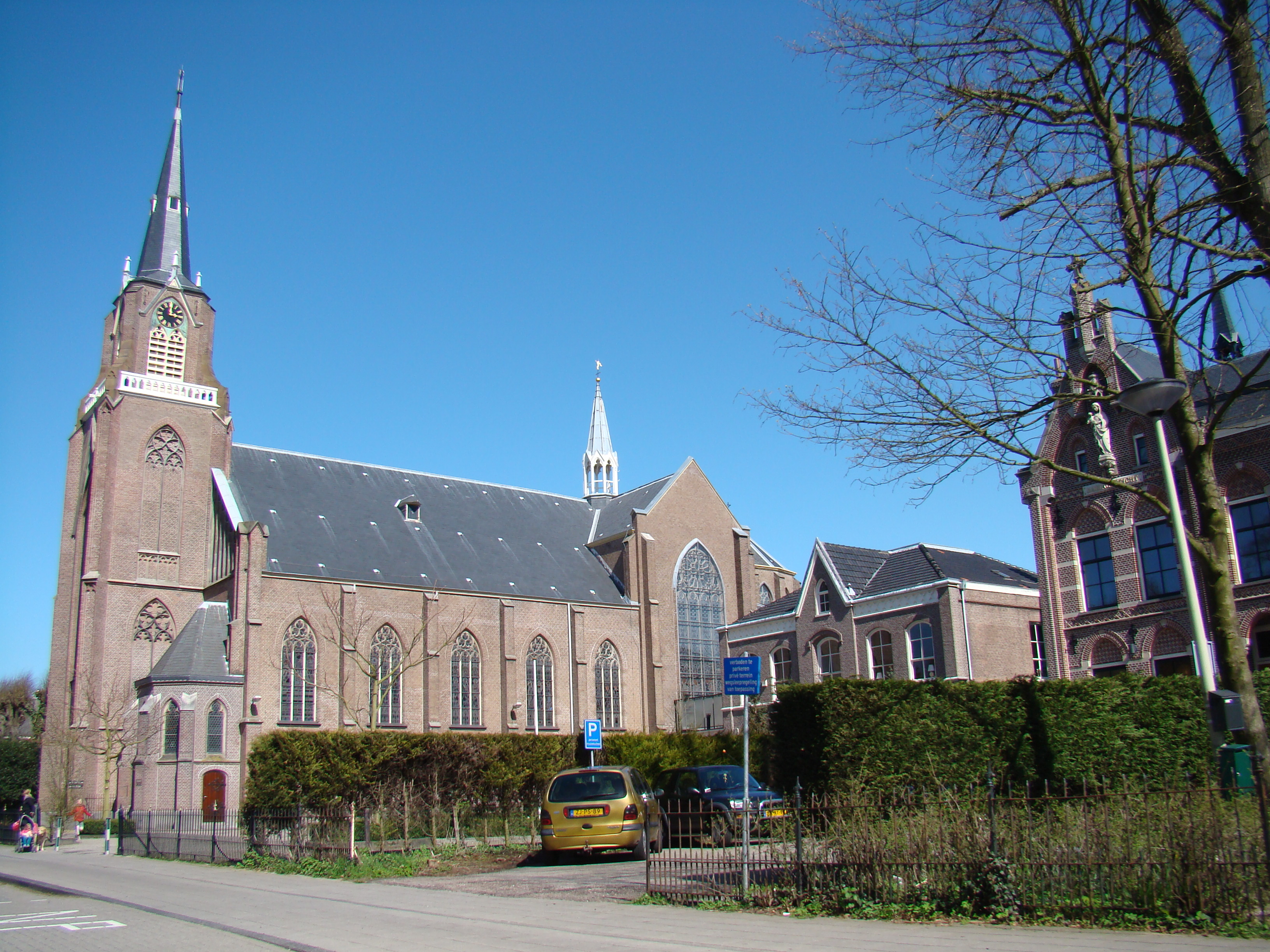
Catholic church
