= Truus Menger-Oversteegen =

Dutch sculptor, painter, and wartime resistance fighter

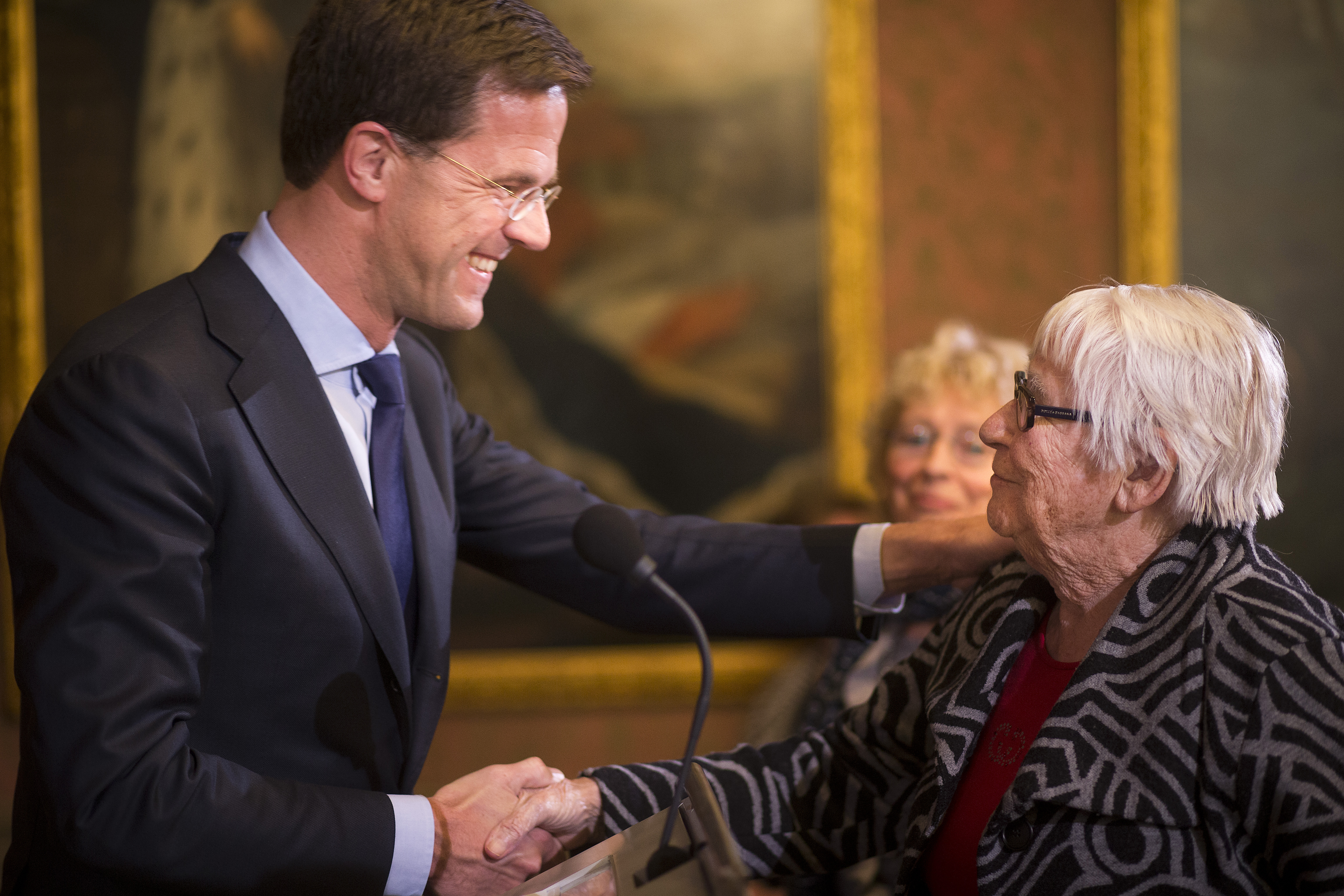
- Truus Menger-Oversteegen being awarded the Mobilisation War Cross
- Born: 29 August 1923; Schoten, Netherlands
- Died: 18 June 2016 (aged 92); Grootebroek, Netherlands
- Citizenship: Dutch
- Known for: Dutch resistance member during World War II
- Spouse: Piet Menger
- Children: 4
- Relatives: Freddie Nanda Dekker-Oversteegen (younger sister)

Truus Menger-Oversteegen (29 August 1923 – 18 June 2016) was a Dutch sculptor and painter. During the Second World War she was a member of the anti-Nazi Dutch Resistance, together with her sister, Freddie Oversteegen, and Hannie Schaft.

Schaft and Truus Oversteegen were planning to liquidate policeman and NSB member Fake Krist on 25 October 1944, but other Haarlem Resistance fighters killed him first. On 1 March 1945, NSB police officer Willem Zirkzee was executed by Schaft and Truus Oversteegen near the Krelagehuis on the Leidsevaart in Haarlem. On 15 March, they wounded Ko Langendijk, who worked for the Sicherheitsdienst (SD). He survived the attack and, in 1948, testified in Amsterdam on behalf of his Velser girlfriend, the traitor Nelly Willy van der Meijden. In 1949, he was sentenced to life imprisonment. An earlier attempt on Langendijk by Jan Bonekamp had also failed.

Schaft and Oversteegen tried in vain to free Jan Bonekamp when he was arrested by the Germans and taken to the Wilhelmina Gasthuis in Amsterdam.

After Schaft was arrested on 21 March 1945, the Resistance assumed that she had been imprisoned at the Weteringschans. Disguised as a German nurse, Oversteegen tried to free her with a story that she had to take Schaft for medical examination. She cried a lot to convince the people there. Schaft, however, turned out to have been on the Amstelveenseweg and had already been executed.

After the war, Truus married Piet Menger in November 1945. The couple had four children, the oldest of whom she named in remembrance of Schaft. She was regularly a guest speaker at universities and secondary schools about wars, antisemitism, tolerance and indifference. Menger-Oversteegen's book about her experiences during the war, Not then, Not now, Not ever, was published in 1982.

On 10 May 1967, Yad Vashem recognized her as Righteous Among the Nations. At her 75th birthday in 1998, Menger was invested as an Officer of the Order of Orange-Nassau for her services. On 15 April 2014, Truus Menger-Oversteegen received the Mobilization War Cross with her sister from Prime Minister Mark Rutte.
