= The Girl with the Red Hair =

1956 biographical novel by Theun de Vries

The Girl With the Red Hair
- Author: Theun de Vries
- Language: Dutch
- Publisher: Querido
- Publication date: 1956
- ISBN: 978-9-021-41198-9

The Girl With the Red Hair (Dutch: Het meisje met het rode haar) is a popular biographical novel by Dutch author Theun de Vries (1907–2005). It was first published in 1956 and has been reprinted many times.

The Girl with the Red Hair is based on the life story of Dutch World War 2 resistance fighter Hannie Schaft.

In 1981, it was adapted into an acclaimed 1981 film with the same title.

== Plot ==
In the novel, Law student Hannie Schaft finds herself in a resistance group where she starts out doing delivery work. When during a protest she is fired upon and a boy is killed in front of her eyes, she decides to become more actively involved in the resistance. Together with the resistance fighter Hugo, who becomes her lover, she begins to assassinate collaborators of the Nazi occupation regime.
