= Erebegraafplaats Bloemendaal =

Cemetery for Dutch WW2 resistance fighters

Coordinates: 52.4015°N 4.5761°E

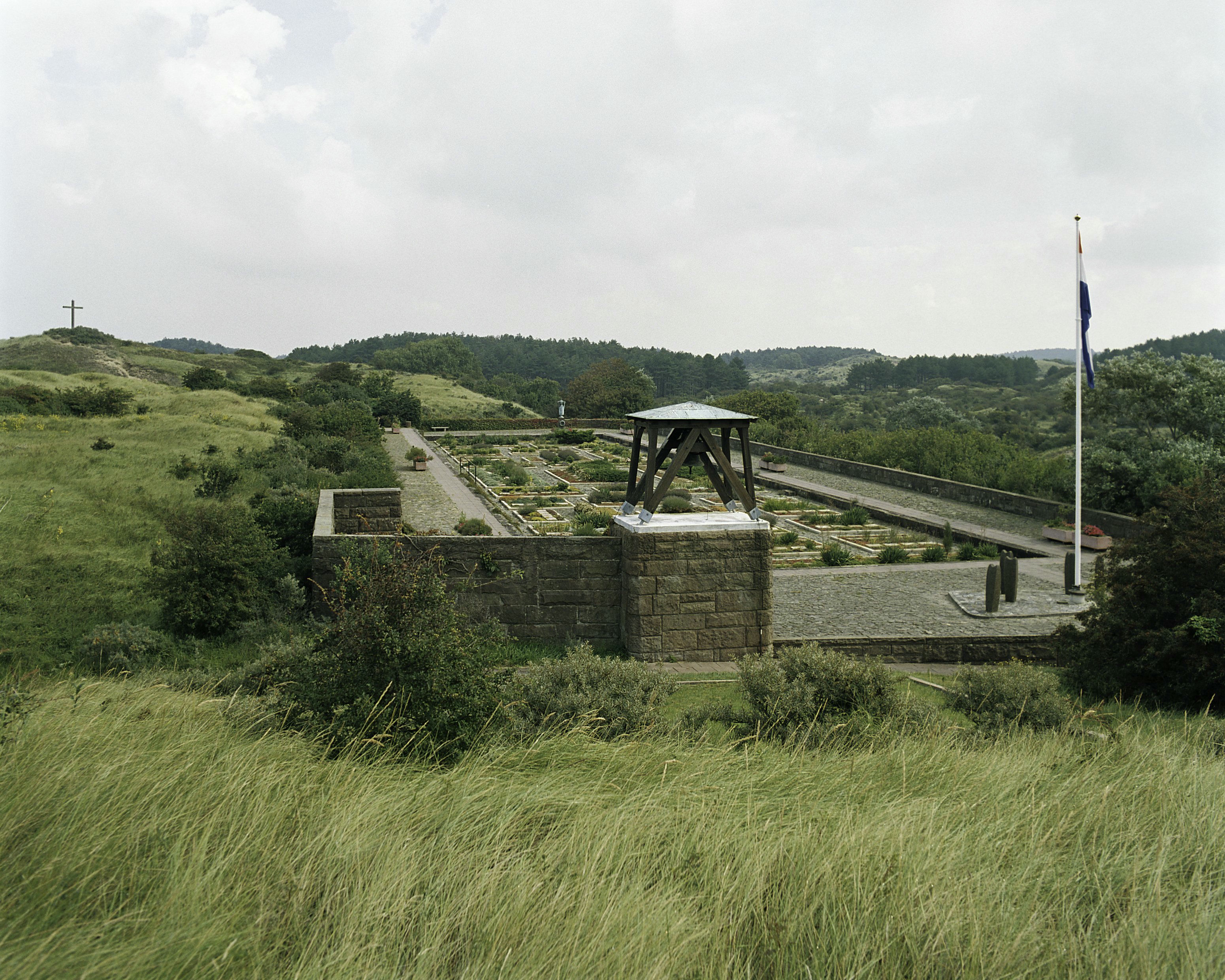
Erebegraafplaats Bloemendaal (2007)

The Erebegraafplaats Bloemendaal, or Dutch Honorary Cemetery Bloemendaal, is a World War II final resting place in Zuid-Kennemerland National Park in Bloemendaal, Netherlands. Located on the top of a dune, it can be reached by a small path from a parking lot located near the provincial route between Overveen center and Zandvoort.

None of the graves were originally located here. The cemetery is a final resting place for victims of the Nazi occupation who were executed in various places in the dunes. A total of 422 victims were found in 45 locations and of those, 347 have been laid to rest in 41 groups in Erebegraafplaats Bloemendaal. Nearby, nine locations of former group burials are marked with simple granite stones. The cemetery was first used on 27 November 1945 for the reburial of the Dutch resistance fighter Hannie Schaft, with a procession from the Grote Kerk, Haarlem. In 2010 the cemetery was awarded the Rijksmonument status.

== List of graves ==
Map of the graveyard (click 3x)

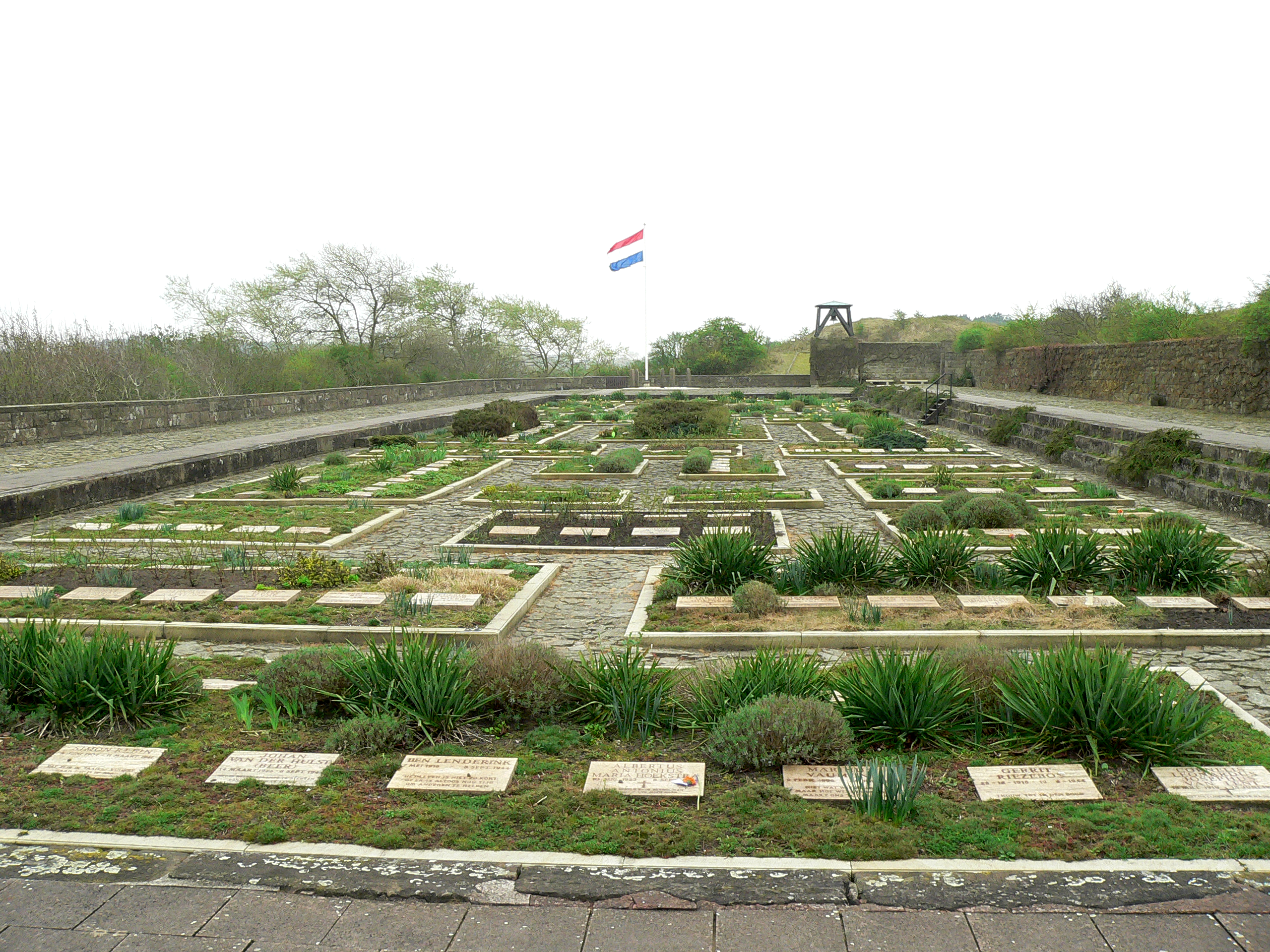
Erebegraafplaats Bloemendaal (2014)

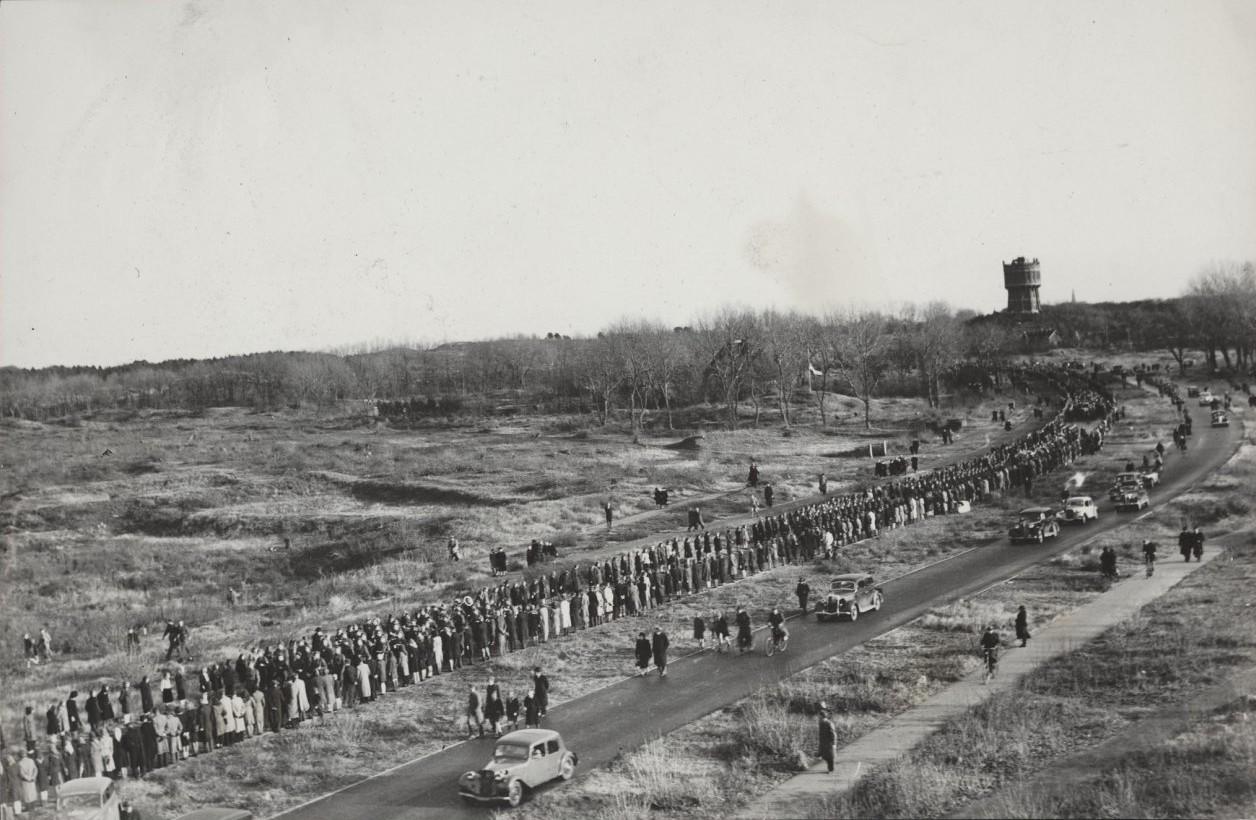
Burial ceremony (27 November 1945)

Some notable graves:

- Willem Arondeus (1894–1943) – Righteous Among the Nations
- Johannes Lambertus "Jan" Bonekamp (1914–1944)
- Paul Guermonprez (1908–1944) – Dutch Cross of Resistance
- Johan Limpers (1915–1944)
- Marinus Post (1906–1944)
- Hannie Schaft (1920–1945)
- Gerrit van der Veen (1902–1944) – Righteous Among the Nations
- Walraven van Hall (1906–1945) – Righteous Among the Nations
- Binnert Philip de Beaufort
- Wim Beerman
- Wim Speelman
- Hans Geul
- Bart Hendriks
- Jan Bonekamp
- Cornelis van der Vegte
- Johan Schimmel
- Albert Jan Rozeman
- Cor ten Hoope
- Johan Schippers
- Wilco Jiskoot
- Mango Kwane Wilco Jiskoot
- Willem Lengton
- Hugo van Lennep
- Jacques Stil
- Johan Brouwer
- Gerrit Kleisen
- Jo Blaauwgeers
- Han van Zomeren
- Markus Assies
- Arie Addicks
- Herman Oolbekkink
- Lodewijk van Hamel
- Kees de Groot
- Willem de Tello
- Cees de Jong
- Johannes Hoogendoorn
- Theodorus Dubois
- Koen Rozendaal
- Jan van der Sloot
- Theo van Gogh the Elder
- Henk Raak
- Frederik Nieuwenhuijsen
- Ada van Rossem
- Albert Marcusse
- Johan Coenraad Heriold Folmer van Hanxleden Houwert
- Frans Duwaer
- Jan Bottema
- Johannes Post
- Jan Niklaas Veldman
- Hendrik Roelof de Jong
- Leo Herman Frijda
- Antonius Otto Hermannus Tellegen
- Hilbert van Dijk (Dutch resistance)
- Bob Oosthoek
- Wibo Sjerp Lans
- Dirk Bons

== Bibliography ==
- Peter Heere, Arnold Vernooij: De Eerebegraaf-plaats te Bloemendaal. 2005, Sdu Uitgevers ISBN 978-9012094856, OCLC 71705065
