= Theun de Vries =

Dutch writer and poet

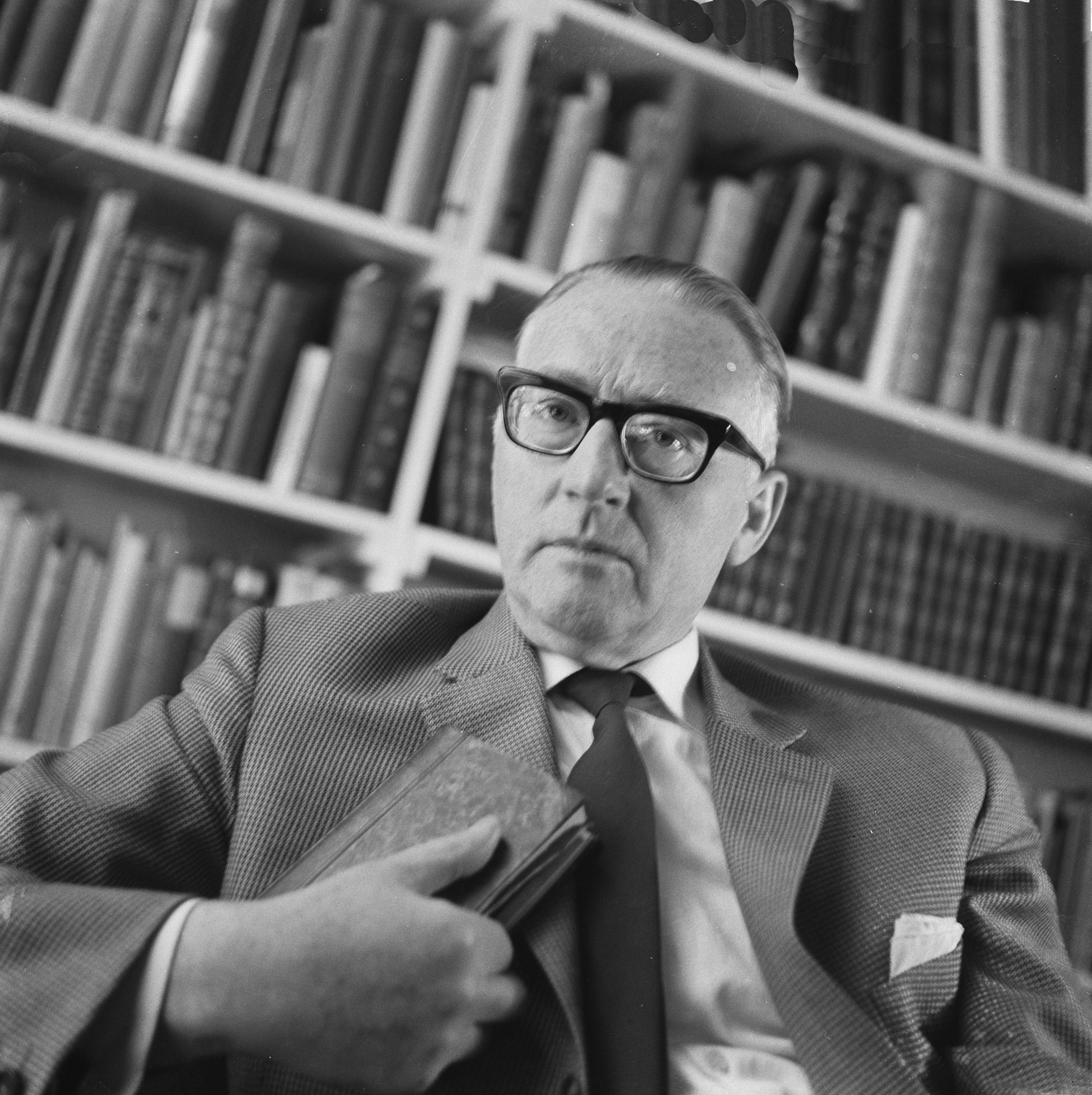
Theun de Vries (1963)

Theunis Uilke (Theun) de Vries (26 April 1907 – 21 January 2005), was a Dutch writer and poet.

== Life ==
De Vries was born in the Frisian town of Feanwâlden. His parents moved to Apeldoorn in 1920. In 1936 he joined the Communist Party of the Netherlands and a year later he moved to Amsterdam to pursue a career in journalism.

He became editor of the communist newspaper De Tribune (later renamed as De Waarheid) and De Vrije Katheder. During the occupation of the Netherlands by the Nazi forces he was arrested and imprisoned in Kamp Amersfoort. After the war he eventually became a member of the city council of Amsterdam. Despite his Communist politics he translated Aleksandr Solzhenitsyn's anti-Soviet novella One Day in the Life of Ivan Denisovich into Dutch in 1963. The Communist Party had every copy of the book destroyed.

In 1971 he left the party without renouncing Marxism, which he continued to uphold until the end of his life.

He died in Amsterdam at the age of 97 after having suffered from several bouts of pneumonia.

== Works ==
De Vries wrote poetry and many novels, both in Dutch and Frisian. Among his most acclaimed novels are The Girl With the Red Hair (Het meisje met het rode haar) about Dutch resistance fighter Hannie Schaft, and the trilogy Februari, also about the Dutch resistance in World War II. The former was turned into an acclaimed 1981 film of the same title.

From his several biographies, his book on Spinoza received international fame, and was translated. Other biographical subjects included Karl Marx, R.J. Schimmelpenninck, Haydn, Bosch, Rembrandt, Van Gogh.

He also wrote a comprehensive and academic history of the Christian heretical movements, Ketters (Heretics).
