= Freddie Oversteegen =

Dutch resistance member in World War II (1925–2018)

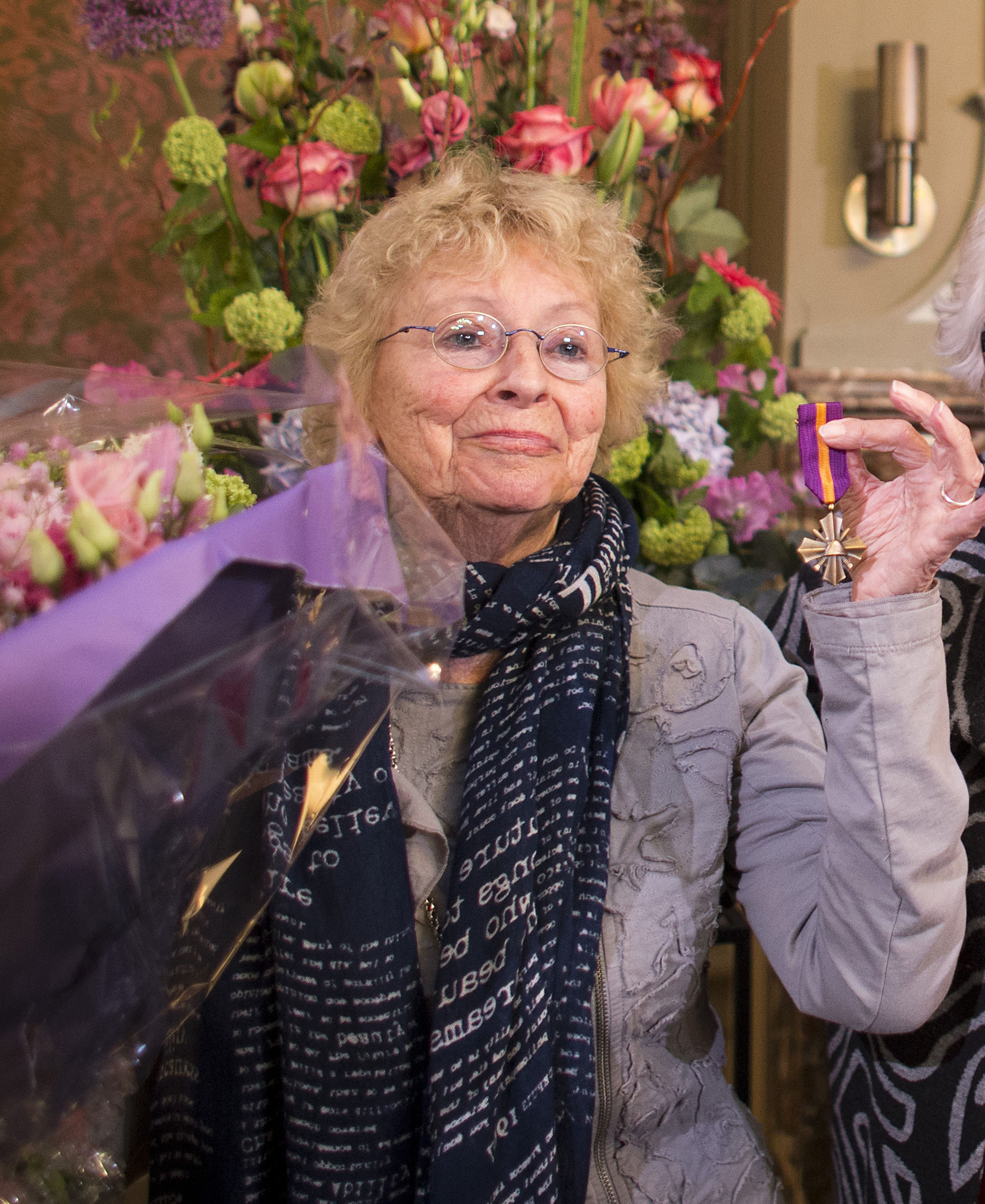
- Dekker-Oversteegen in 2014
- Born: Freddie Nanda Oversteegen; 6 September 1925; Schoten, Netherlands
- Died: 5 September 2018 (aged 92); Driehuis, Netherlands
- Citizenship: Dutch
- Known for: Dutch resistance member during World War II
- Spouse: Jan Dekker
- Children: 3
- Relatives: Truus Menger-Oversteegen (older sister)
- Awards: Mobilisation War Cross

Freddie Nanda Dekker-Oversteegen (6 September 1925 – 5 September 2018) was a member of the Dutch resistance during the German occupation of the Netherlands in World War II.

== Early life ==
Freddie Oversteegen was born on 6 September 1925 in the village of Schoten, Netherlands. She had an older sister, Truus Menger-Oversteegen.

She and her family lived on a barge. Before the war started in the Netherlands, the Oversteegen family hid people from Lithuania inside the hold of their ship.

After the divorce of her parents, Oversteegen was raised by her mother. She moved from the barge to a small apartment. Her mother later remarried and gave birth to her half-brother. The family lived in poverty.

== World War II ==
During World War II, the Oversteegen family hid a Jewish couple in their home. Freddie Oversteegen and her older sister Truus began handing out anti-Nazi pamphlets, which attracted the notice of Haarlem Council of Resistance commander Frans van der Wiel. With their mother's permission, the girls joined the Council of Resistance, which brought them into a coordinated effort. Freddie was fourteen years old at the time.

Oversteegen, her sister, and friend Hannie Schaft worked to sabotage the Nazi military presence in the Netherlands. They used dynamite to disable bridges and railroad tracks. They also smuggled Jewish children out of the country or helped them escape concentration camps.

The Oversteegens and Schaft also killed German soldiers, with Freddie being the first of the girls to kill a soldier by shooting him while riding her bicycle. They also lured soldiers to the woods under the pretense of a romantic overture and then killed them. Oversteegen would approach the soldiers in taverns and bars and ask them to "go for a stroll" in the forest.

== Post-war life ==
Oversteegen served as a board member on the National Hannie Schaft Foundation, which was established by her sister, Truus. In 2014, Freddie and Truus were awarded the Mobilisation War Cross (Mobilisatie-Oorlogskruis) by Dutch Prime Minister Mark Rutte for their acts of resistance during the war. There is also a street named after her in Haarlem.

Oversteegen experienced a series of heart attacks towards the end of her life. She died on 5 September 2018 in a nursing home in Driehuis, one day before her 93rd birthday.

== Personal life ==
Freddie Oversteegen married Jan Dekker. They had three children.
