= Adrian Hoekstra =

Dutch Resistance warrior

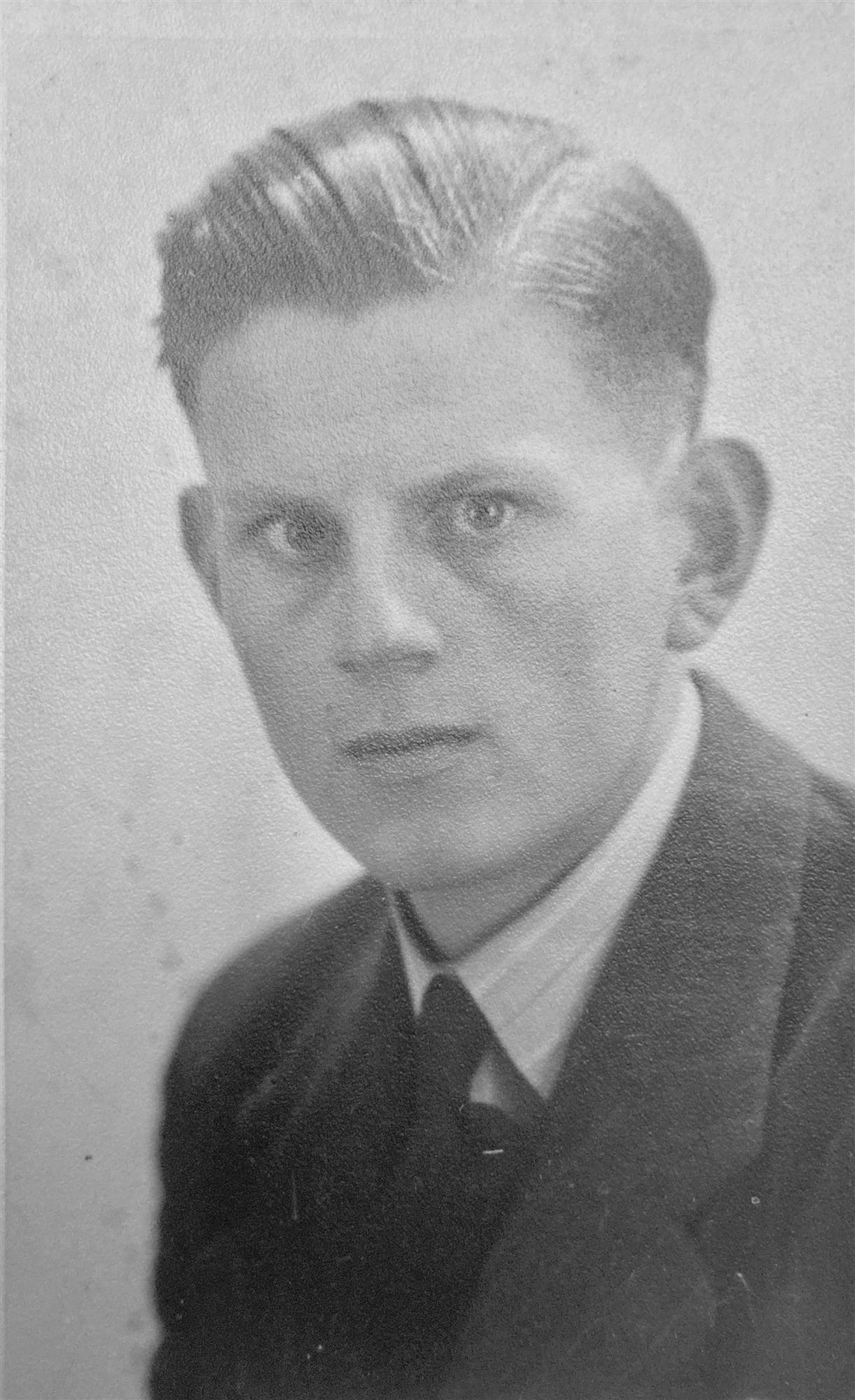
Hoekstra in 1942

Adrianus Johannes Antonius Hoekstra (28 August 1917 - 7 February 1998) was a member of the Dutch Resistance during World War II.

Hoekstra was born in Oosterhout (NB, The Netherlands) on 28 August 1917.

Hoekstra’s involvement in the Dutch Resistance began with the OD (Ordedienst or Order of Service), a local group preparing for the return of the exiled Dutch government. He later extended to assisting Jews and downed Allied pilots who were in hiding. Additionally, he contributed to the provision of information for the Allies in Britain about airfields, railway lines, mine production and German troop movement. In March 1944, he was arrested and sent to a forced labour camp in Germany. He escaped in March 1945 and returned to Oosterhout as the Allied army fought eastwards towards Berlin.

In 1950, he was awarded the Mobilisation War Cross (Mobilisatie-Oorlogskruis) for his war-time activities.

In 1980, the Dutch Government instituted the Resistance Memorial Cross (Verzetsherdenkingskruis) to recognise resistance workers from World War II, and Hoekstra was awarded the medal in 1982. The resistance group he was involved in for the greatest time was honoured with a monument in the town of Schipperskerk, Limburg in September 2024.

== Early years ==
Hoekstra was born in Oosterhout to Johannes Theodorus Hoekstra and Bernardina Hoekstra (nee Looymans). His father had four children from a previous marriage. Hoekstra was his sixth child. Hoekstra’s father owned a cigar making factory called Lombok Cigars.

Hoekstra attended primary school in Oosterhout. His secondary schooling included first boarding at a Capuchin seminary in Velp and later attending an Augustinian grammar school in Eindhoven. In part because of his dislike of boarding as well as his father’s precarious financial position, he left school at the age of 15 to work in the factory. In 1938, his father declared bankruptcy. Due to the legal circumstances of the time, the factory continued to operate, and Hoekstra remained involved in the running of the factory with one of his older half-brothers, Joop (Johannes Henricus).

== War years ==
Germany invaded the Netherlands on 10 May 1940. Hoekstra’s other half-brother, Fredericus J Hoekstra, was killed in action within the first hour of the invasion. After the Dutch capitulation, Hoekstra was recruited to the resistance movement by Mr. Abeelen, an associate of Colonel Jan Somer, and soon became the leader of the OD in Oosterhout. He also worked with the resistance cell centered around Pater Jacques Kerssemakers OSB. In that group, Hoekstra coordinated the passing of information regarding troop movements, local airfields, railway lines and so on, through channels to the Allies in Britain.

In October 1942, with the arrest of Kerssemakers imminent, Hoekstra went into hiding in Limburg using the alias Wim Koenraad. Initially, he stayed on the bunker-ship De Zwaan, which was permanently anchored at Grevenbicht and served as a supply vessel for other boats. When Hoekstra arrived on De Zwaan there were already Jewish families hiding on board. The boat’s skipper, Kees Zwaans, in conjunction with two other local residents, Twaan Maintz and Frans Kooimans, had set up a group they named MaZwaKo, initialisms of their surnames, to coordinate the resistance activities in the area. Around the time Hoekstra arrived on board and became involved, Kooimans left the group though he continued hiding Jewish families and pilots throughout the war. The group’s name, however, did not need to be changed because of Hoekstra’s alias.

Hoekstra remained on De Zwaan for about a year, sometimes acting as a deckhand on other boats, despite his lack of experience. A number of Jewish families, Allied pilots, and men escaping from forced labour camps passed through the group. MaZwaKo also worked with the Pietab-OXO resistance cell which operated around Utrecht in the north of the Netherlands, as well as with the remnants of Hoekstra’s original group from the Oosterhout area. Hoekstra was the point of contact for each of these.

In October 1943 Hoekstra left De Zwaan, but stayed in Limburg with the Mainz family to continue his resistance activities. Increasingly he travelled around the Netherlands accompanying fugitives from the Nazis to be dropped off at other safe houses, picking up microfilm, documents and other information, and liaising with the various cells, especially Pietab-OXO.

While on a mission in February 1944, Hoekstra was arrested and taken to a prison in Scheveningen nicknamed Oranjehotel. Suspecting that he had been betrayed as Wim Koenraad, he reverted to his own name. His interrogators did not make any connection to the activities of his alias, and on 2 May, he was transferred to a holding camp in Amersfoort. On 19 May, he was sent to the Rheinhausen prison camp, which provided forced labour to the Krupp Hüttenwerke steelworks.

On 31 March 1945, whilst being transported further into Germany, Hoekstra escaped when the train he was on was stopped in Duisburg during an Allied bombing raid. He sought refuge in the local Catholic church, St Peter Canisius, and was able to stay until the advancing Allied army took control of the area and he could return to the Netherlands.

== Post War years ==
Hoekstra married Clara Isabella Oomen in Oosterhout on 9 October 1945. The couple subsequently had five children.

He returned to work in the tobacco industry but could see the impending concentration of the industry, which would spell the end for small family run cigar factories in the Netherlands. The loss of the Dutch colonies in Indonesia hastened this situation. In August 1959, the family migrated to Australia and settled in Sydney, where Hoekstra retrained as an industrial chemist.

In anticipation of the 50th anniversary of the end of the war, he wrote a memoir of his experiences. These were accepted by the Dutch War Archives when he returned to the Netherlands for the celebrations in May 1995

Hoekstra died of cancer at Camden (NSW, Australia) on 7 February 1998.

== Aftermath ==
In September 2024, descendants of the members of the MaZwaKo resistance group and their helpers throughout the war gathered in Born and Schipperskerk in Limburg to commemorate their heroism. A monument was unveiled in a ceremony attended by representatives of the King, the Army, the Yad Vashem Jewish Holocaust museum, and two of Hoekstra's children. Also in attendance was Lyda Silbernberg, who had been in hiding on De Zwaan when Hoekstra first took refuge there, as well as descendants of other Jewish families who had been saved by the group.

De Zwaan is now a tourist vessel, Freyade:Freya (Schiff, 1905), operating on day trips out of Kiel in Germany.
