= Mobilisation War Cross =

Mobilisation War Cross Mobilisatie-Oorlogskruis
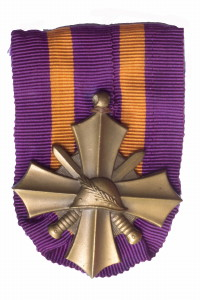
- Obverse of the Mobilisation War Cross
- Type: Military campaign decoration
- Awarded for: Six months service between 6 April 1939 – 20 May 1940
- Presented by: the Kingdom of the Netherlands
- Campaign: World War II
- Status: No longer awarded
- Established: 11 August 1948
- Undress ribbon of the cross

Precedence
- Next (higher): New Guinea Commemorative Cross
- Next (lower): Cross for Justice and Freedom

The Mobilisation War Cross (Dutch: Mobilisatie-Oorlogskruis) is a Dutch medal awarded for service during World War II.

== Establishment and criteria ==
The Mobilisation War Cross was established on 11 August 1948 by royal decree of Queen Wilhelmina. Those eligible for the award include military personnel who served for at least six months between 6 April 1939 – 20 May 1940. However, the Cross can also be awarded to non-military personnel or people who did not serve a full six months, as long as the subject performed military tasks for the Kingdom of the Netherlands.

On 1 December 1992, the original royal decree was rescinded and replaced.

== Notable recipients ==
- Coosje Ayal
- Adrian Hoekstra
- Ted Meines
- Truus Menger-Oversteegen
- Freddie Oversteegen
- Adriaan Paulen
- Godfried van Voorst tot Voorst
- Henri Winkelman
