= Walraven van Hall =

Dutch banker and resistance leader

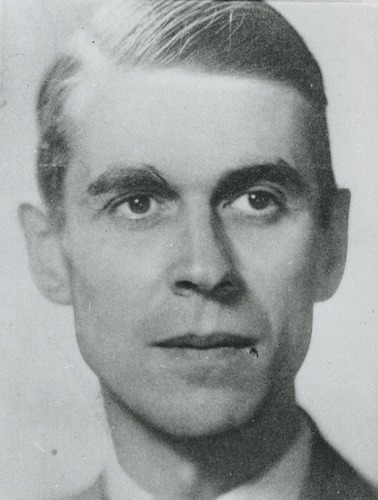
- Born: 10 February 1906; Amsterdam, Netherlands
- Died: 12 February 1945 (aged 39); Haarlem, Netherlands
- Resting place: Erebegraafplaats Bloemendaal, Overveen
- Other names: Banker to the Resistance, Barends, "oom Piet", "de Olieman", Van Tuyl
- Occupation: Banker

Walraven "Wally" van Hall (10 February 1906 – 12 February 1945) was a Dutch banker and resistance leader during the occupation of the Netherlands in World War II. He founded the bank of the Resistance, which was used to distribute funds to victims of the Nazi occupation of the Netherlands and fund the Dutch resistance. Van Hall was executed by the German occupiers in Haarlem shortly before the end of the war and buried at the Erebegraafplaats Bloemendaal.

== Early life ==
Born into an influential Dutch family, Walraven van Hall initially studied to become an officer in the merchant marine, but after having worked for some years as third mate he was rejected because of his eyesight. Unable to work in the merchant marine, he moved to New York City in 1929. His brother, future Mayor of Amsterdam Gijs van Hall, who already worked at a bank, helped him get a job with a Wall Street firm. Having thus been introduced to banking, Walraven van Hall returned to the Netherlands and became a banker and stockbroker.

== World War II ==
After the Germans invaded the Netherlands in May 1940, a fund was established to help families of merchant-sailors (who were stranded abroad when war broke out). Van Hall was asked to help set up the Amsterdam chapter together with his brother Gijs. Because of his banking experience, Walraven van Hall was able to provide funding with the help of guarantees by the Dutch government in London. Soon thereafter, the Germans began taking anti-Jewish and forced labour measures; resistance against these measures increased. Van Hall, who expanded his fund-raising activities for all kinds of resistance groups, became known as the banker to the resistance.

One of the ways in which Van Hall raised funds for the resistance was the "robbing" of De Nederlandsche Bank (Dutch National Bank). With the approval of the Dutch government-in-exile, the Van Halls managed to obtain as much as 106 million Dutch guilders, which corresponds to 500 million euros as per 2016. Together with his brother, Van Hall falsified bank bonds and exchanged them in the bank for the real bonds. With these, paper money was collected. This was done behind the back of Rost van Tonningen, president of the bank and a notorious member of the Dutch Nazi party National Socialist Movement in the Netherlands (NSB).

Another way of collecting money was borrowing from wealthy Dutch people. As a proof of their investments, they received a worthless old stock, but after the war they could get their money back in exchange for the stock paper.

In 1944, Walraven was the leader of the NSF (National Support Fund); he was also the coordinator of the Kern ("Nucleus") and the Driehoek ("Triangle"), a cooperation of various Dutch resistance groups. The NSF supported a variety of resistance groups and underground papers like Het Parool, Trouw and Vrij Nederland.

=== Nicknames ===
Besides being called the banker to the resistance, Walraven had various additional nicknames in the resistance movement to ensure that his real name was not exposed. Notably, he was called the Olieman (The Oilman) for his abilities to lubricate the friction between resistance groups, as well as Barends, Oom Piet (Uncle Pete) and primarily Van Tuyl (or Van Tuyll).

=== Courier ===
His personal courier was Hanneke Ippisch, author of the book Sky: a True Story of Courage during World War II. Her job was to find a safe meeting place every Friday for the resistance leaders.

=== Arrest ===
On 27 January 1945, the meeting place was given away by a member of the resistance who had been arrested the day before and who wrongly believed the members of the meeting would know he had been arrested and would not attend the meeting. Although the Germans had a vague idea there had to be somebody who coordinated the finances for the resistance, they never found out it was Van Hall. In January 1945, Teus van Vliet, a founding member of the Dutch resistance, was betrayed by the Dutch collaborator Johan van Lom. Van Vliet broke under torture; as a result, the Germans were led to several leading members of the resistance, including Van Hall.

=== Execution and burial ===
Van Hall was subsequently executed in Haarlem alongside seven other resistance members as revenge for the death of a high-ranking police officer. After the war, he was buried in Overveen in the Erebegraafplaats Bloemendaal (Cemetery of Honour).

== Honorable distinctions ==
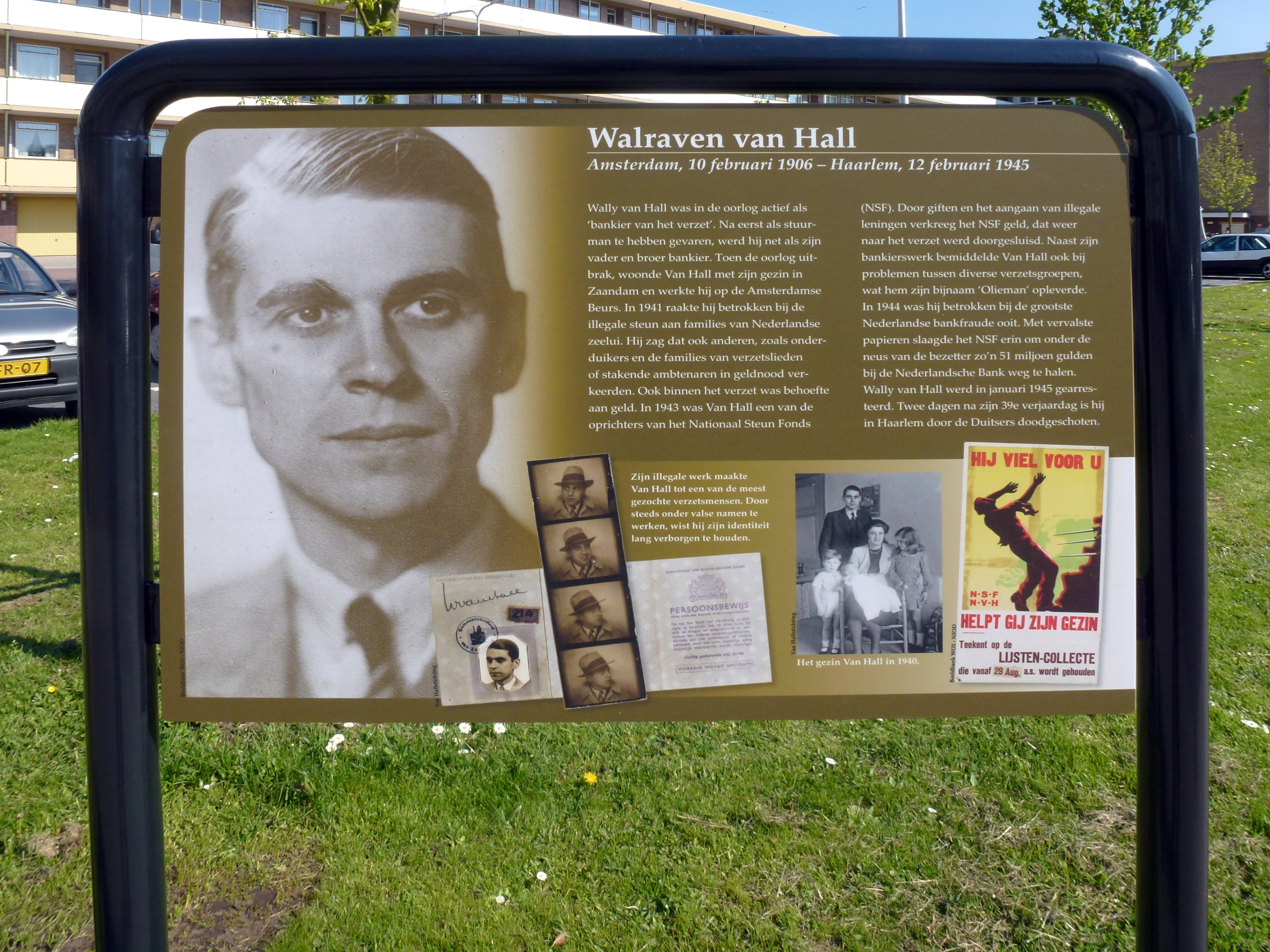
Memorial at Gouda

Van Hall was posthumously awarded by the government with the Dutch Cross of Resistance (Verzetskruis) in 1946 and the United States awarded him with the Medal of Freedom with Gold Palm. Israel recognised him as "Righteous Among The Nations" in 1978 for supporting and funding between 800 and 900 Jews in hiding during the war.

In honour of his deeds in the resistance, a monument was erected in autumn 2010 near the office of the Dutch Central Bank, at Frederiksplein 40 in Amsterdam-Centrum.

== In media ==
The Resistance Banker (Bankier van het Verzet), directed by Joram Lürsen and starring Barry Atsma as Van Hall, is a 2018 Dutch World War II period drama film based on Van Hall's work to finance the Dutch resistance during the Second World War.
