= Johan Limpers =

Dutch sculptor

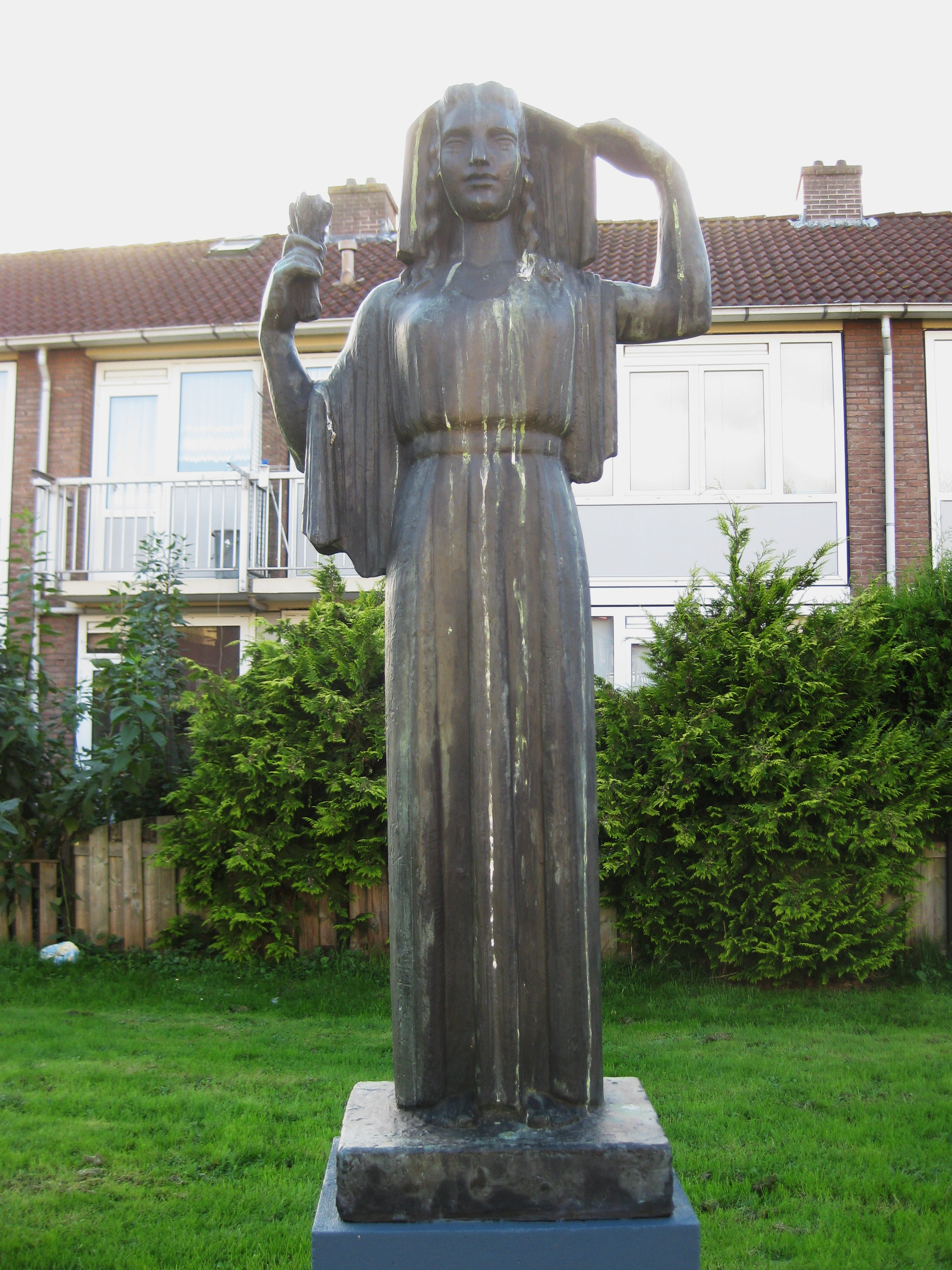
Kora by Johan Limpers in 1940. This was his prize winning sculpture for which he received his Prix de Rome. It was placed in 1969 at the Arondeusstraat in front of the Johan Limpersstraat as a memorial.

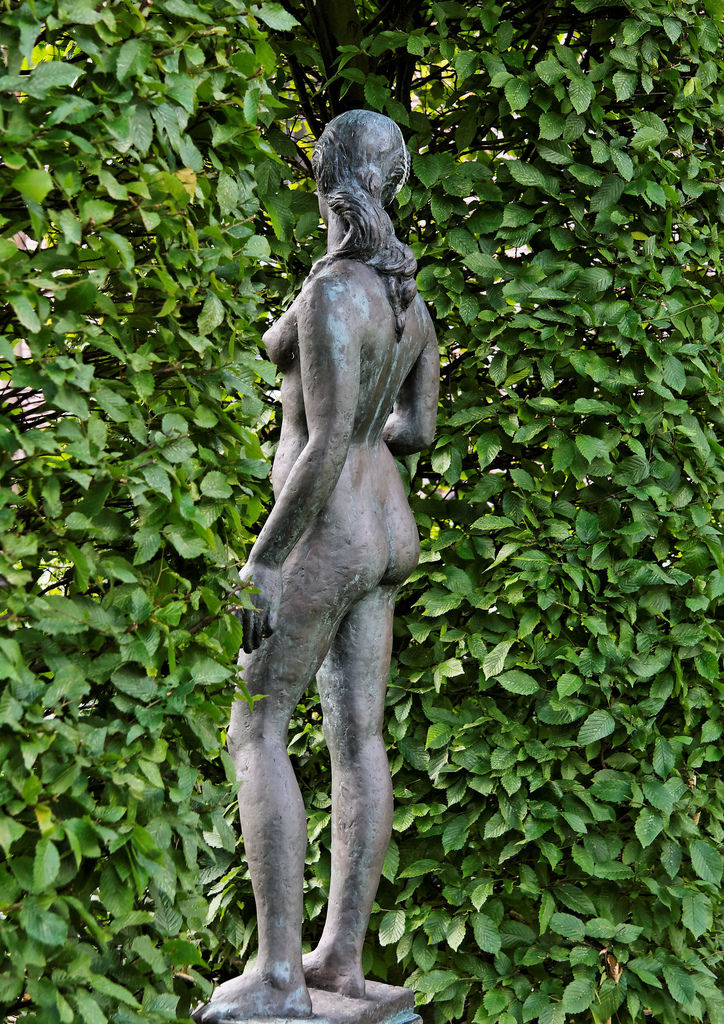
Eva by Johan Limpers

Johan Limpers (2 August 1915, in Heemstede – 10 June 1944, in Overveen) was a Dutch sculptor.

Limpers was a student of Jan Bronner at the Rijksakademie. His work followed the ideas of Jan Bronner and was monumental, for this he won the Dutch equivalent of the Prix de Rome in 1940.

During the Second World War he was active in the resistance and took part in setting fire to the Amsterdam registration office in 1943. He was executed by a German firing squad at Overveen. After the war he was reburied at the Eerebegraafplaats Bloemendaal.

He was married with fellow member of the resistance and sculptor Katinka van Rood.
