= Sexual violence during the Holocaust =

During World War II and the Holocaust, Jewish men and women faced sexual violence, especially in Nazi concentration and death camps, caused by wartime discrimination, widespread antisemitism, Nazi racial theories, and the genocidal beliefs held by Adolf Hitler and the Nazi regime in Germany. Sexual violence and discrimination happened throughout Nazi-occupied Europe, including in Jewish people's homes and hiding spaces, as well as in public and at designated killing sites.

There were more than 44,000 camps and sites for incarceration under the control of the Nazi regime between 1933 and 1945. Jewish people were targets of sexual violence and segregation because of their race. The Nazis used incarceration sites for a variety of reasons, especially for the forced physical and sexual labor from their prisoners. There have been many accounts from both men and women survivors, but many stories remained private due to taboos and stigmas surrounding rape. Gender-based violence, sexual violence, and antisemitic viewpoints contributed to the maltreatment and violence against Jewish people during the Holocaust.

== Origins ==
Most Jewish men and women were targeted by the Nazi regime during World War II due to the regime's belief that the Jewish race was inferior in comparison to the so-called Aryan race. Racial antisemitism arose in Europe due to the Nazi regime, but its origins can be traced back throughout history to the rise of Christianity. Antisemitism persisted through the Medieval times, peaked during the World Wars, and is still seen today .

The origins of the sexual violence perpetuated against Jewish people during the Holocaust are multifaceted and created sexually violent behaviors, especially in men, who were the primary perpetrators. Germans and their allies, including Hungarians, Romanians, and Italians, were the primary perpetrators of the sexual violence against Jewish people in concentration camps, but sexual violence was also committed by other prisoners

The motivations for sexual abuse included political and ideological forces against the Jewish body, wartime accustoming people to violence and killing, military culture emphasizing physical strength and hegemonic masculinity, misogynistic views of Nazi beliefs, and individualized motives, such as a need for power. These factors combined to perpetuate a culture of abuse and maltreatment during the Holocaust.

== Stereotypes and stigmas ==
There were many stereotypes assumed about Jewish people and their sexuality, and some still persist globally. Stereotypes surrounded the women who engaged in acts of sexual service or prostitution during the war, even when occurring as survival purposes and non-consensual sex. The Nazi regime viewed their own bodies as superior to those of the Jewish people, as they thought of the Jewish body as subhuman. The regime would use caricatures with disfigured body parts in public media as propaganda to spread their message against the Jewish body. Caricatures could often be seen with disproportionately large noses and big curly hair.

Jewish men also experienced stigma around sexual abuse, rape, and other acts that they also faced during the Nazi regime. Jewish men are often portrayed as kind, gentle, sensitive, and delicate. These traits are associated with femininity in the West. Stereotypes depict Jewish men as inferior to the traditional Western man. This belief was reinforced during Holocaust by the Nazis who inflicted shame and humiliation on Jewish victims. Many sexual stereotypes against Jewish men continue today.

== Withheld and erased histories ==
It has been difficult to research sexual violence during in the Holocaust due to taboos and the sensitive nature of the topic. Survivor testimonies were hard to collect, especially because of the unknown number of victims of sexual violence that did not survive the war. Obstacles around collecting data have caused some historians to lose interest in researching sexual violence during wartime. This led to a popular narrative of the Holocaust that excludes the sexual violence faced by the Jews.

After World War II, a large number of Jewish survivors fled Europe. More than 150,000 Jewish people immigrated to America. Despite their large immigration numbers, most survivors did not initially tell their stories. In interviews that took place in the 1990s, Holocaust survivors often said that they rarely spoke about their wartime experiences and the violence that they faced for decades after the war. Survivors stayed silence due to the traumatic burden of telling their stories. It was often a struggle for survivors to recount their experiences and memories of sexual violence during World War II. Some survivors reported difficulties because of the heightened emotions associated with their experiences. Several survivors thought their accounts were too much for most people to listen to and believe, so they chose to stayed silent. Survivors also refused to tell their stories due to the shame and stigma of sexual violence.

Most American media from the post-war period focused on the liberation of the Jewish people and was dramatized to be more inspiring to viewers. Popular Holocaust media did not recount the sexual violence that occurred, and American consumers did not learn about it. Media erasure of sexual violence, along with the racial purity laws prohibiting intercourse between Aryans and Jews at the time, have led some to believe that sexual violations did not occur.

== Eugenics and sterilization ==
The Nazi regime created persecutory policies which were based upon principles from eugenics. Nazi eugenics sought to classify people and their worth based on race. The movement's belief systems were based on racial discrimination of traits that were said to be unfavorable. Theories of racial hygiene influenced Hitler's way of thinking and affected policy making. Eugenic policies were used as a way to justify eugenic sterilization of people with mental disabilities. Jewish people were also victims of eugenic sterilization. Hitler thought Jews were wrecking the German 'Aryan race', and that they should not be allowed to reproduce with Germans. Historical evidence shows that there may have been mass sterilization of Jewish women in concentration camps. Prisoners may have unknowingly been administered exogenous hormones that resulted in 98% of women losing their ability to menstruate upon arriving at the camps. There was also similar evidence found in Hungarian camps, where 94.8% of female camp prisoners lost their ability to menstruate upon arrival to the camp.

In 1935, a law that prohibited racial mixing in marriages was put in place. The Blood Protection Law criminalized sexual relations between Jews and non-Jewish Germans. This law did not mandate sterilization, but focused on criminalizing racial mixing.

== Sexual violence against women ==
Jewish women in Europe faced heightened sexual violence during wartime efforts. Sexual violence and dehumanization of Jewish people happened due to an abundance of reasons such as the culture of wartime, and misogyny.

=== Documented histories of women in concentration camps ===
During World War II, sexual violence was common in concentration camps, and was perpetrated by guards and other inmates. Jewish women in the camps often faced humiliation, physical assault, sexual assault, rape, and coercion into working in the Nazi brothels. If women became pregnant during their time in the camps, they were either killed or forced to abort their child. Forced nudity was used as a punishment. These conditions were unfavorable and contributed to the dehumanization of Jewish women in concentration camps.

Ava Dorfman was a survivor of the Holocaust who recounted her time at the Janowska camp, in Ukraine. She recounted the trauma she witnessed:

One time in the roll-call order there were young people, and the older people were sitting, and the Ukrainian took — her name was Bosha — took her out, and we thought maybe he was going to save her, but when she came back, she said he raped me, and then he came and shot her. I had all her blood, you could [imagine] everything from her brain. He shot her right here in the head. How can you have a very normal life when you think of that.

=== Bodily functions ===
Concentration camps did not have hygienic living conditions. The Nazis controlled prisoners' bodily functions, taking away the agency of women. Women did not have privacy and were often forced to urinate in front of the guards and their fellow inmates. If they were working, women would be often denied the chance to urinate. Most women in the camps lost the ability to menstruate due to malnourishment or sterilization efforts. When women did get their periods their blood would flow down their legs, since hygiene products and extra clothing were not available to them.

==== Brothels ====
Some Jewish women were taken from the concentration camps and put into Nazi brothels, where they would work as "camp whores". Prisoners may have been persuaded to join the brothels in order to escape the poor living conditions within concentration camps. They were offered food and better sleeping conditions in exchange for participating in sex with the officers. Other women prisoners were not given the option, and were forcibly sexual assaulted. In accounts from survivors of the Auschwitz camp, there were only two paths for women: the gas chamber or the brothel. The brothels were established to encourage the more privileged prisoners to work, and to provide an opportunity for officers and guards to rape women. Some survivors recounted their time in the brothels, which often include stories of being threatened, beaten, and humiliated, along with being raped. Most working as sex slaves were eventually killed.

== Sexual violence against men ==
Men in concentration camps were exposed to similar forms of violence and humiliation as women, but their experiences were under-researched and often concealed due to social, cultural, and religious expectations. Masculinity has historically been associated with strength, aggression and power, and the gender norms associated with men during wartime caused erasure of their experiences. Some authors have suggested that the erasure of Jewish men and boys' sexual victimization during the Holocaust has been due to scholars traditionally associating the dehumanization of males with lethal violence or gendercide, rather than sexual violence.

While the sexual violence Jewish men and boys endured during the Holocaust has some similarities to that of women, their specific experiences required different theorizations of how the male body is sexually victimized. Tommy J. Curry suggested that hyper-masculine and effeminate tropes of Jewish men contributed to their sexual victimization during the Holocaust.

Men and boys faced a variety of forms of sexual violence in concentration camps, including castration, non-consensual examinations of genitalia, sexual taunting, rape, assault, sterilization, and being forced to penetrate others. Many Jewish men had their hair forcibly shaved, including their beards and sidelocks. They were sometimes forced to shave one another's hair as a means of humiliation. Experiences of violence were often found in diaries and memoirs of boys and men in concentration camps.

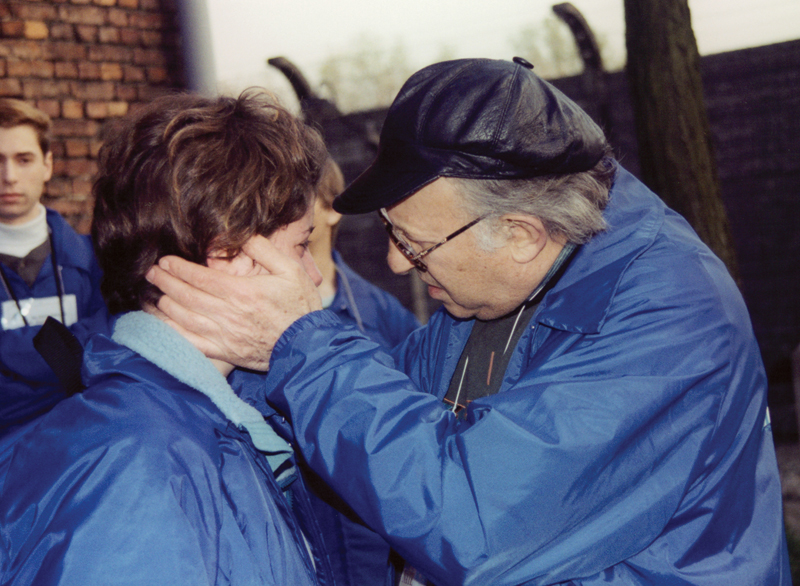
Nate Leipciger, a Holocaust survivor and sexual abuse survivor, comforting a young student during the March of the living Auschwitz in 2019. Picture from the Museum of Jewish Heritage.

The rape of Jewish men and boys during the Holocaust is documented in the Visual History Archive (VHA) housed at the USC Shoah Foundation. In 2017, the USC Shoah Foundation interviewed Tommy J. Curry about his research regarding the rape and sexual victimization of Jewish men and boys during the Holocaust. This interview included a discussion of how the VHA previously labeled all sexual violence between men as "homosexual relationships." Curry explained that the archive's mislabeling created confusion as to which relationships between men were consensual and which were coercive. This label also made it difficult for researchers to see the sexual violence Jewish males suffered, as well as the role racialization and dehumanization had in explaining the vulnerability of Jewish men and boys to sexual violence.

== Documented histories of men in concentration camps ==
According to Holocaust survivor Sam Lubat in an oral history interview in 1998, sexual violence against men during the Holocaust was common and occurred more often than it was recorded. Lubat described the sexual violence towards men as 'shameful'. Literature and discourse surrounding camp survivors reinforced homophobic stereotypes and stigma around survivors.

in a memoir published in 2015, Polish Holocaust survivor Nate Leipciger described his experiences of encounters with a room elder named Janek. He hid his experiences from his father, who was also imprisoned in the same camp as him. The abuse included visits during the night, forcible penetration, and exploitative sexual bartering.

Sidney Klein, a Holocaust survivor from Slovakia recounts his sexual assault in the camp hospital by someone he referred to as a 'lab technician':

He took me to the office, and he was offering me all kinds of things, and he raped me, he raped me and then he wanted me to come and see him like every week … I was trying to get away from him, and a few times I was able to do it, but then he was threatening me that if I am not going to come, I will lose my job.

== Sexual violence against children ==
Children and adolescents were also affected by sexual and sexualized violence during the Holocaust. Research based on survivor testimonies has shown that such violence occurred in different situations of persecution, where displacement, dependency and the loss of family protection increased the vulnerability of minors. Many survivors were not able to understand or name these experiences at the time. In later testimonies, they often appear as memories marked by silence, shame and lasting consequences.

Scholarship has framed this subject as part of the wider history of Nazi persecution rather than as an isolated form of violence. It emphasizes that age shaped both exposure to danger and the ability to act within coercive environments. In camps and forced labor settings, sexual and sexualized violence against minors was closely connected to hierarchies of power, dependence, and the collapse of ordinary protection. The literature also shows that these experiences were shaped by gender and by the specific situation in which victims found themselves. Because many accounts were given only retrospectively, the subject requires careful source criticism and attention to forms of violence that long remained difficult to articulate.

== See also ==
- Judaism and sexuality
- Judaism and violence
- Jewish women in the Holocaust
