= Schoten, North Holland =

Coordinates: 52°24′25″N 4°38′33″E

Coat of Arms of Schoten

Schoten (Dutch pronunciation: [ˈsxoːtə(n)]) is a former village in the Dutch province of North Holland. It was located between Haarlem and Santpoort.

Schoten was a separate municipality between 1817 and 1927, when it was merged with Haarlem. The municipality consisted of the northern part of the current municipality of Haarlem, north of the old city, between the Delft and Spaarne rivers.
