= Johan van Lom (Dutch collaborator) =

Dutch lawyer

Johan (Han) van Lom (3 June 1918 – 6 March 1945) was a Dutch lawyer who worked with the Dutch resistance during World War II and toward the end of the war collaborated with the Nazis, allowing them to arrest other members of the Dutch resistance in return for the freedom of a family friend. His betrayal of Teus van Vliet led to the arrest and subsequent execution of Walraven van Hall, banker and leader of the resistance. Van Lom himself was later executed by members of the resistance.

== Life ==
Van Lom had trained as a lawyer but was unable to finish his studies during the German occupation. He found work with the lawyer Jan de Pont, whose firm, in The Hague and Amsterdam, defended Jewish families and members of the Dutch resistance. In that capacity he met a number of high-ranking resistance members, including Wim van Norden, then publisher of the illegal newspaper Het Parool. De Pont managed to get a considerable number of Parool people released after a trial, the so-called tweede Parool-proces (second Parool trial), before the German Obergericht (High Court) at Utrecht in 1944. After the trial, van Norden asked de Pont to assist him in setting up a pension fund for resistance fighters. De Pont declined because he wanted at all costs to avoid being associated with illegaliteit (illegal activity), directing him instead to van Lom, an idealistic and newly married young man.

Why van Lom subsequently turned collaborator is a matter of contention among journalists and family members; one theory, subscribed to by Loe de Jong in his The Kingdom of the Netherlands During World War II and based on a confession that van Lom made when questioned by the Dutch resistance (the interrogation was led by Wim Sanders), is that van Lom had an affair with a friend of his wife and his wife's sister. According to this theory, van Lom gave up information that led to the arrest of a number of resistance members in exchange for the freedom of the young woman. He had negotiated with Friedrich Viebahn of the Sicherheitsdienst in Amsterdam that none of the people arrested were to be executed; Viebahn kept his promise, although he did not feel bound by it in the case of van Hall.

Van Lom fled Amsterdam after the arrests in January 1945, and returned in March. After a meeting with a resistance member he was abducted and interrogated, and sentenced to die by poisoning. Either he refused to drink the poison or it did not have the desired effect and he was finally dispatched with a shot to the neck, his body dumped in the Keizersgracht. He was 26 years old.
