= Niuta Tajtelbaum =

Polish Jewish WWII resistance fighter (1917–1943)

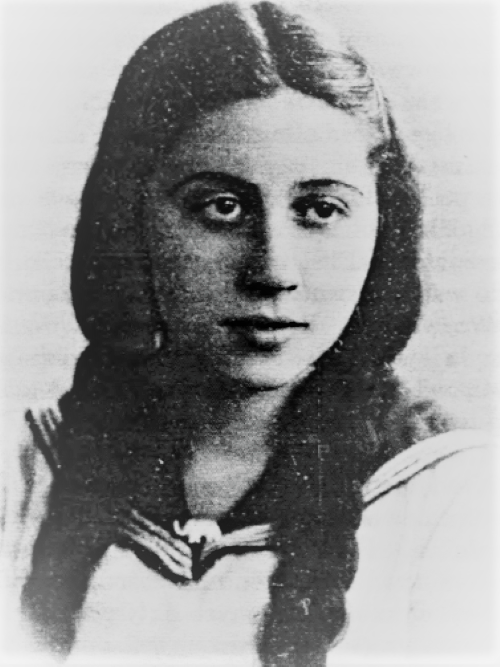
- Born: Ryfka Tajtelbaum; 31 October 1917; Łódź
- Died: July 1943 (aged 25); Warsaw
- Other names: Wanda, Wanda Witwicka

Niuta Tajtelbaum (31 October 1917 – July 1943) was a Jewish resistance fighter in Warsaw, Poland, during World War II.

Niuta Tajtelbaum was born as Ryfka Tajtelbaum on October 31, 1917, in Łódź. Her father was Icek Majer Tajtelbaum, a factory owner. During the war, she was a courier for the Jewish Combat Organization and the Communist Gwardia Ludowa (GL). She also smuggled weapons and people. As a resistance fighter, she was "known to braid her hair, dress up as a Polish peasant girl, and enter homes and offices in disguise to kill Nazis". In 1943, Teitelbaum shot five Nazi soldiers in one day. She was wanted by the Gestapo, which placed a bounty of 150,000 złotys on her head. She was a member of the "Spetzgruppe" (special unit) that bombed a cinema frequented by Nazi soldiers in Warsaw on 17 January 1943. Tajtelbaum was captured by the Nazis on 19 July 1943, tortured, and killed.

Tajtelbaum's story was told in the 2021 book The Light of Days: The Untold Story of Women Resistance Fighters in Hitler's Ghettos by Judy Batalion.
