= Hannie Schaft =

WWII Dutch resistance fighter

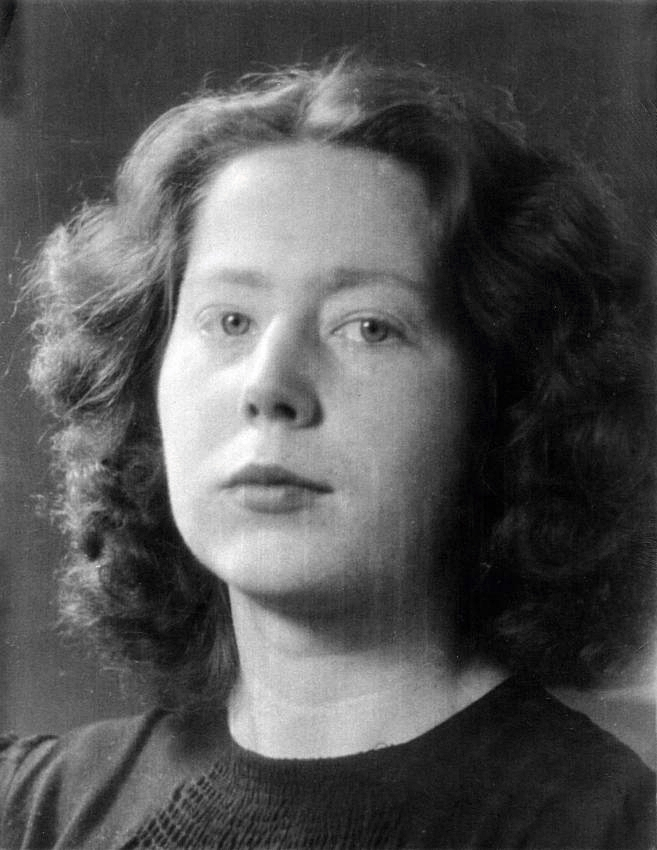
- Schaft c. 1940s
- Born: Jannetje Johanna Schaft; 16 September 1920; Haarlem, Netherlands
- Died: 17 April 1945 (aged 24); Bloemendaal, Reichskommissariat Niederlande
- Cause of death: Execution by shooting
- Resting place: Erebegraafplaats Bloemendaal, Bloemendaal
- Other name: The girl with the red hair
- Known for: Resistance fighter during World War II
- Awards: Righteous Among the Nations, Resistance Memorial Cross, Dutch Cross of Resistance, Medal of Freedom

Jannetje Johanna (Jo) Schaft (16 September 1920 – 17 April 1945) was a communist Dutch resistance fighter during World War II. She became known as "the girl with the red hair" (Dutch: het meisje met het rode haar, German: das Mädchen mit dem roten Haar). Her secret name in the resistance movement was "Hannie".

== Early life and education ==
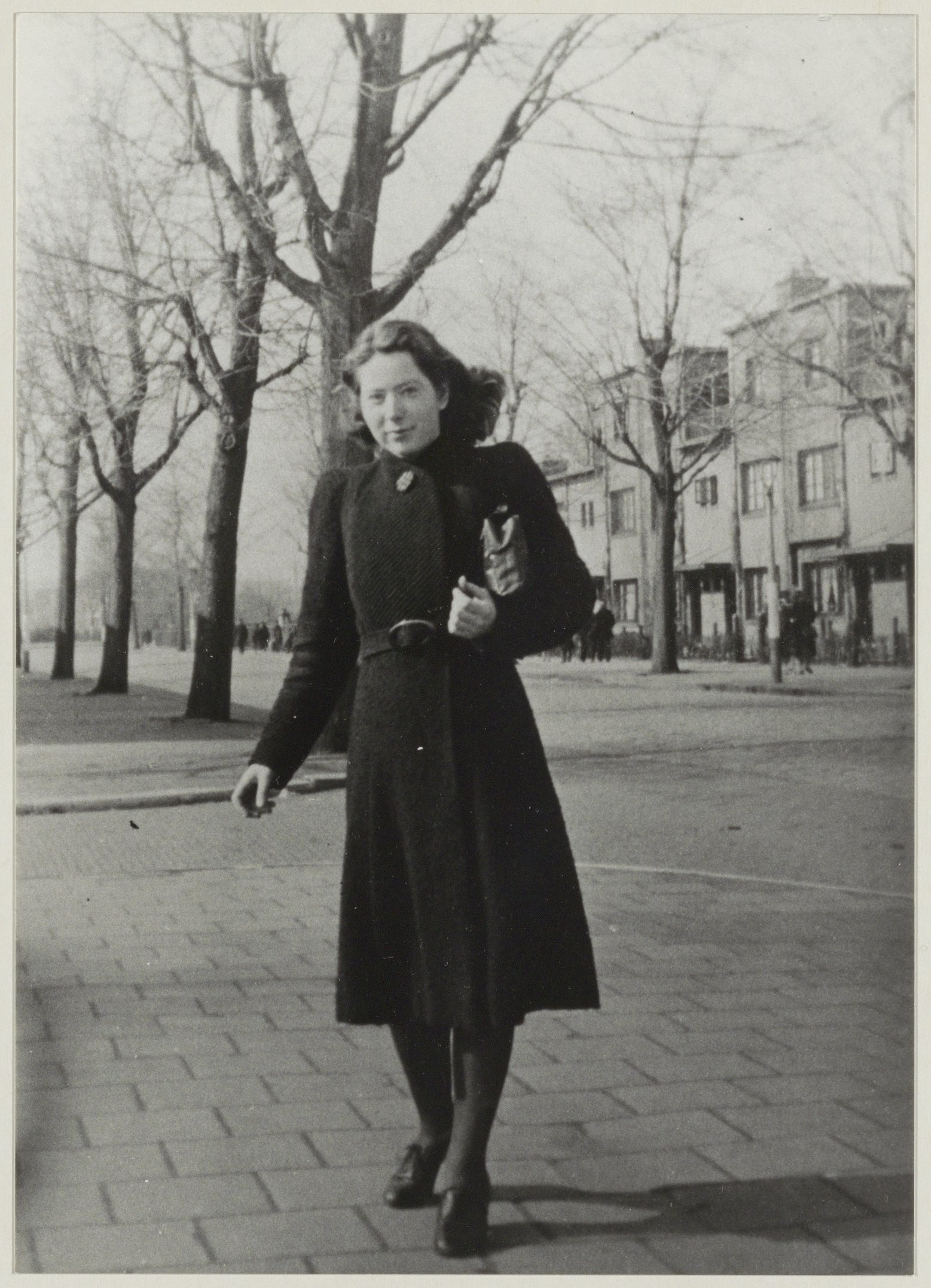
Hannie Schaft on the Kleverlaan, Haarlem, between 1938 and 1940. Noord-Hollands Archief / Fotoburo de Boer

Jannetje Johanna Schaft was born in Haarlem, the capital of the province of North Holland. Her mother, Aafje Talea Schaft (born Vrijer) was a Mennonite and her father, Pieter Schaft, a teacher, was attached to the Social Democratic Workers' Party. The two were very protective of Schaft because of the death due to diphtheria of her older sister Anna in 1927.

From a young age, Schaft discussed politics and issues of justice with her family, which encouraged her to pursue law and become a human rights lawyer. After high school in Haarlem, Schaft started studying law in 1938 at the University of Amsterdam. She became friends with the Jewish students Sonja Frenk and Philine Polak. This made her feel strongly about actions against Jews. During the German occupation of the Netherlands in World War II, Schaft started volunteer work with the Red Cross, where she rolled bandages, assembled first aid kits for soldiers, and assisted German refugees. In 1943, university students were required to sign a declaration of allegiance to the occupation authorities. When Schaft refused to sign the petition in support of the occupation forces, like 80% of the other students, she could not continue her studies. In the summer of 1943 she moved in with her parents again, taking Frenk and Polak with her who went into hiding and helping them get false identity cards.

== Resistance work ==
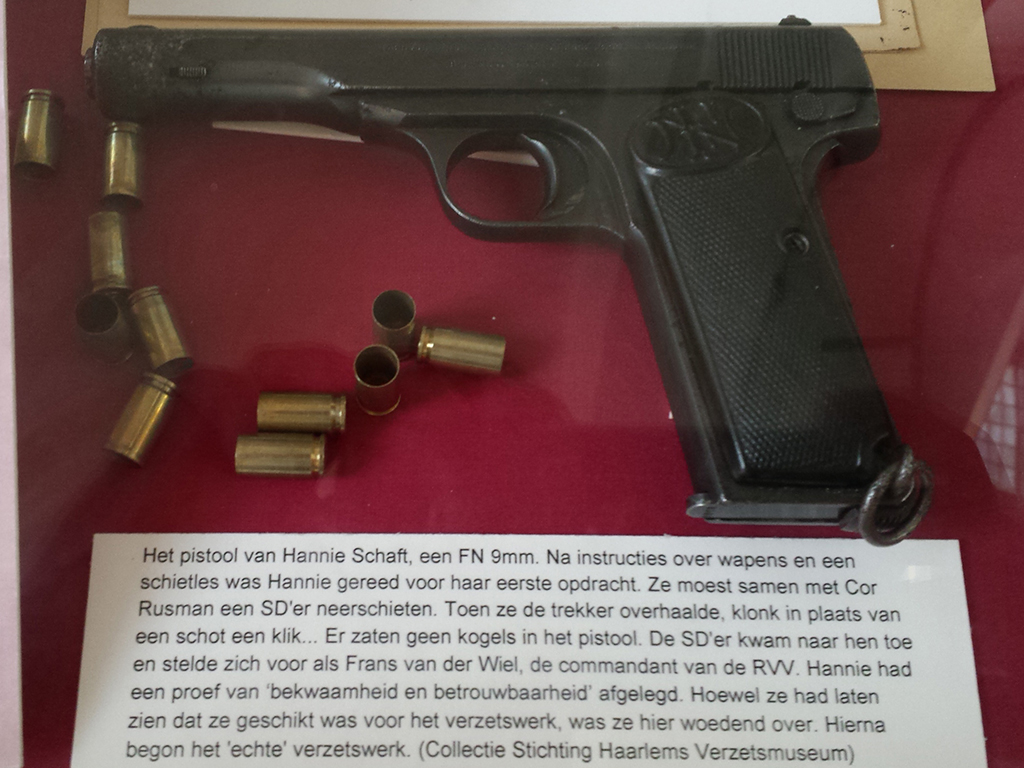
Pistol of Hannie Schaft, FN M1922

Schaft's resistance work started with small acts. First, she would steal ID cards for Jewish residents (including her friends). Upon leaving university, she joined the Raad van Verzet ('Council of Resistance'), a resistance movement that had close ties to the Communist Party of the Netherlands. There she met two sisters, Truus and Freddie Oversteegen, who became her close friends and would survive the war. Rather than act as a courier, Schaft wanted to work with weapons. She was responsible for sabotaging and assassinating various targets. She carried out attacks on Germans, Dutch Nazis, collaborators and traitors. She learned to speak German fluently and became involved with German soldiers. Before facing her targets, Schaft put on makeup — including lipstick and mascara — and styled her hair. In one of the few direct quotations that have been attributed to Schaft, she explained to Truus Oversteegen: "I'll die clean and beautiful."

Schaft did not, however, accept every assignment. When asked to kidnap the children of a Nazi official she refused. If the plan had failed, the children would have to be killed, and Schaft felt that was too similar to the Nazis' acts of terror. When seen at the location of a particular assassination, Schaft was identified as "the girl with the red hair". Her involvement led "the girl with the red hair" to be placed on the Nazis' most-wanted list.

On 21 June 1944, Schaft and Jan Bonekamp, a friend in the resistance, carried out an assassination in Zaandam on Dutch police officer and collaborator Willem Ragut. Schaft fired first and hit Ragut in the back. Bonekamp was shot in the stomach by Ragut before killing him. Mortally wounded, Bonekamp fled the scene but was arrested shortly afterwards and taken to hospital. There he inadvertently gave Schaft's name and address to Dutch Nazi nurses feigning to be Resistance workers. To force Schaft to confess, German authorities arrested her parents and sent them to the Herzogenbusch concentration camp near the city of Den Bosch. The distress of this situation and her grief over Bonekamp's death forced Schaft to cease resistance work temporarily. Her parents were released after nine months.

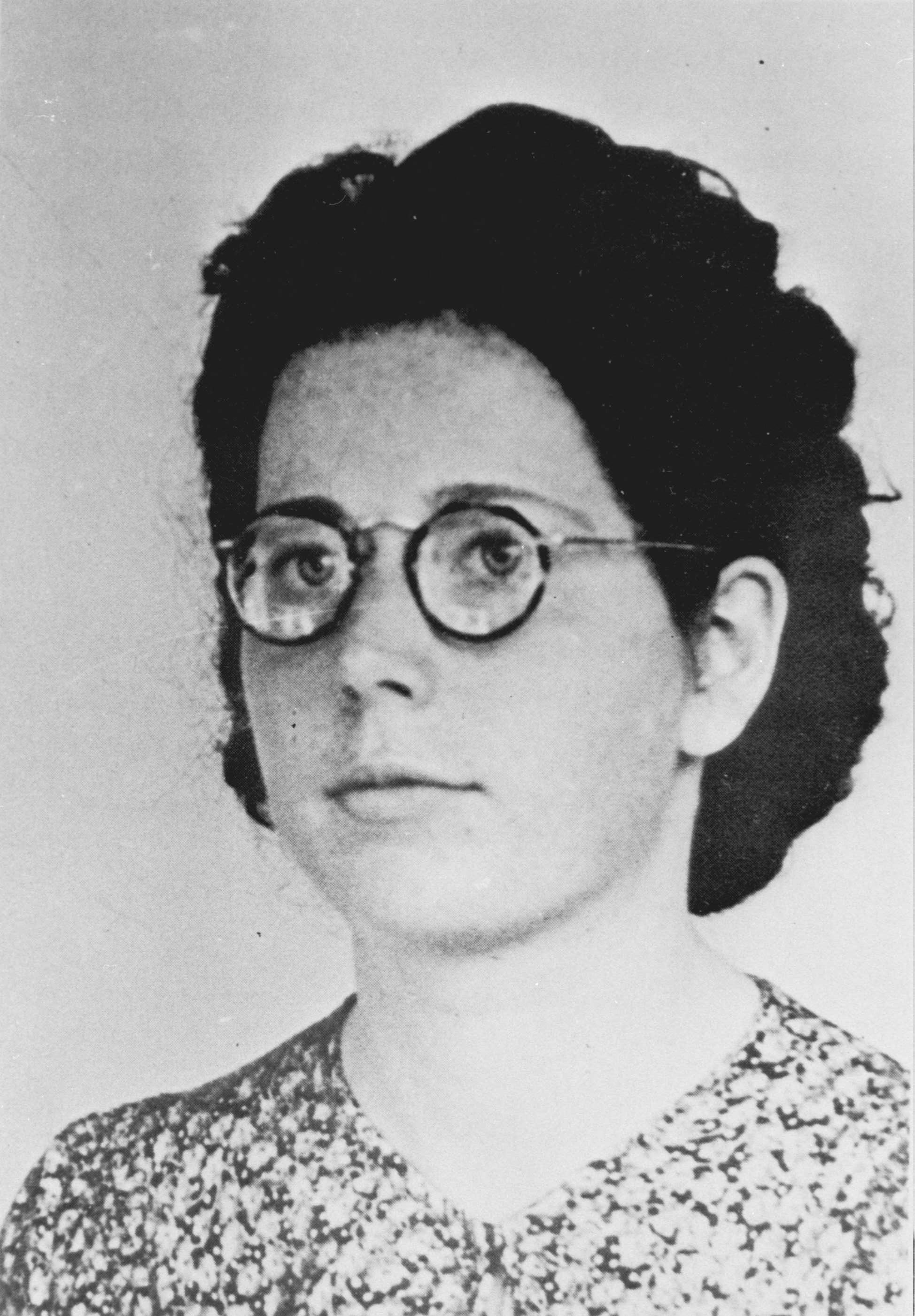
Hannie Schaft in disguise, with black dyed hair and wire-frame glasses, 1944

When she resumed her Resistance work, Schaft dyed her hair black and wore glasses to hide her identity. She once again contributed to assassinations and sabotage, as well as courier work, and the transportation of illegal weapons and the dissemination of illegal newspapers. Schaft and Truus Oversteegen were planning to liquidate NSB member and Haarlem policeman Fake Krist (in Dutch) on 25 October 1944, but other Haarlem resistance fighters were ahead of them.

On 1 March 1945, NSB police officer Willem Zirkzee was killed by Schaft and Truus Oversteegen, near the Krelagehuis on the Leidsevaart in Haarlem. On 15 March they wounded Ko Langendijk, a hairdresser from IJmuiden who worked for the Sicherheitsdienst (SD), a Nazi intelligence agency. He survived the attack and in 1948 he testified in Amsterdam for the benefit of his Velser girlfriend, the traitor Nelly Willy van der Meijden. In 1949 he was sentenced to life imprisonment.

== Arrest and death ==
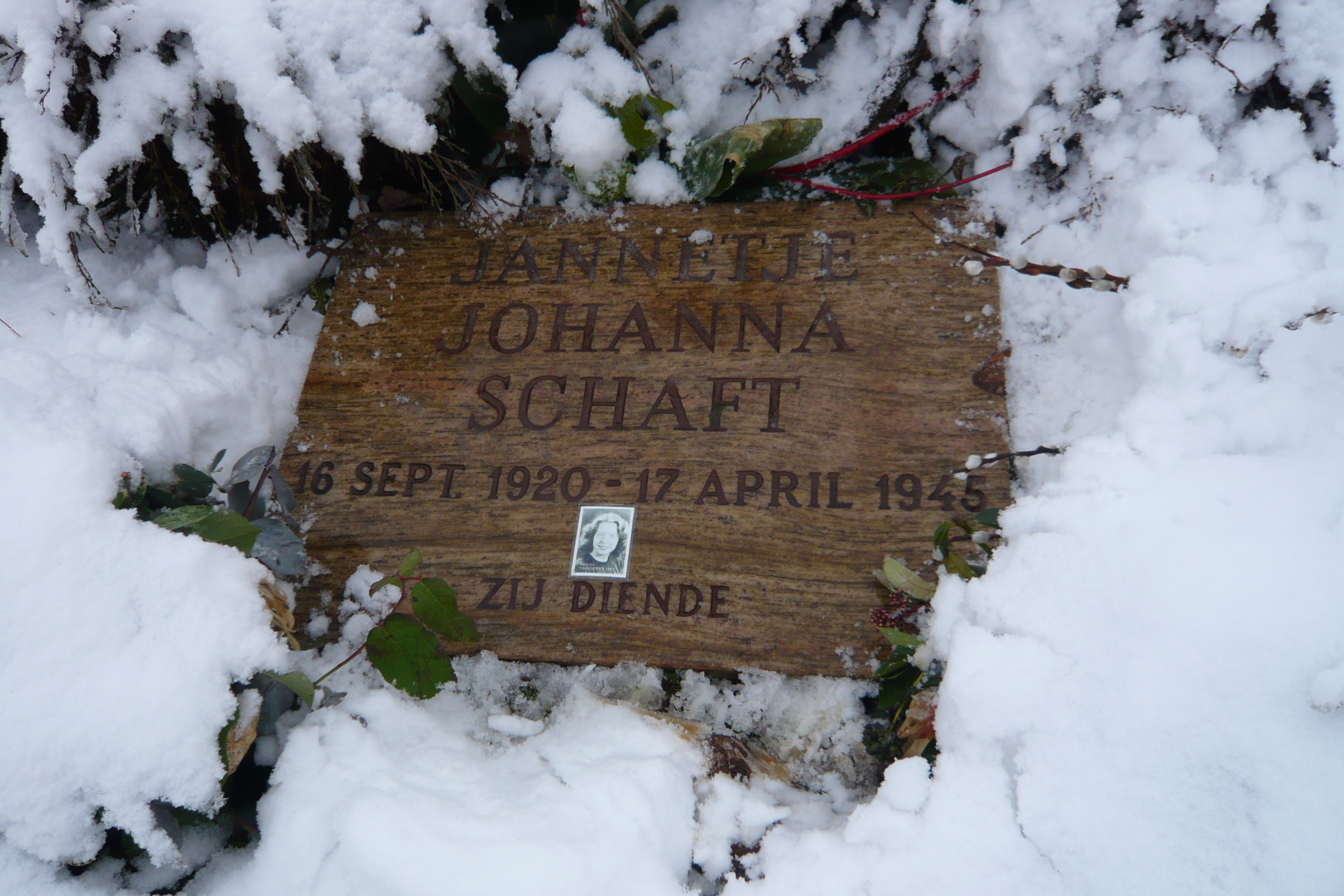
Gravestone with Hannie Schaft's school photo on it; Eerebegraafplaats Bloemendaal

Schaft was eventually arrested at a military checkpoint in Haarlem on 21 March 1945 while distributing the illegal communist newspaper de Waarheid ('The Truth'), which was a cover story. She was transporting secret documentation for the Resistance. She worked closely with Anna A.C. Wijnhoff. She was brought to a prison in Amsterdam. After much interrogation, torture, and solitary confinement, Schaft was identified by the roots of her red hair by her former colleague Anna Wijnhoff. Schaft admitted her Resistance activities, but there is no evidence that she gave the Nazis information about her fellow fighters.

Schaft was executed by Dutch Nazi officials on 17 April 1945. Although at the end of the war there was an agreement between the occupier and the Binnenlandse Strijdkrachten ('Dutch resistance') to stop executions, she was shot dead three weeks before the end of the war in the dunes of Overveen, near Bloemendaal. Two men known as Mattheus Schmitz and Maarten Kuiper took her to the execution site. Schmitz shot her in the head at close range. However, the bullet only grazed Schaft. She allegedly told her executioners: Ik schiet beter "I shoot better!", after which Kuiper delivered a final shot to her head. Schaft's execution was directly ordered by Willy Lages.

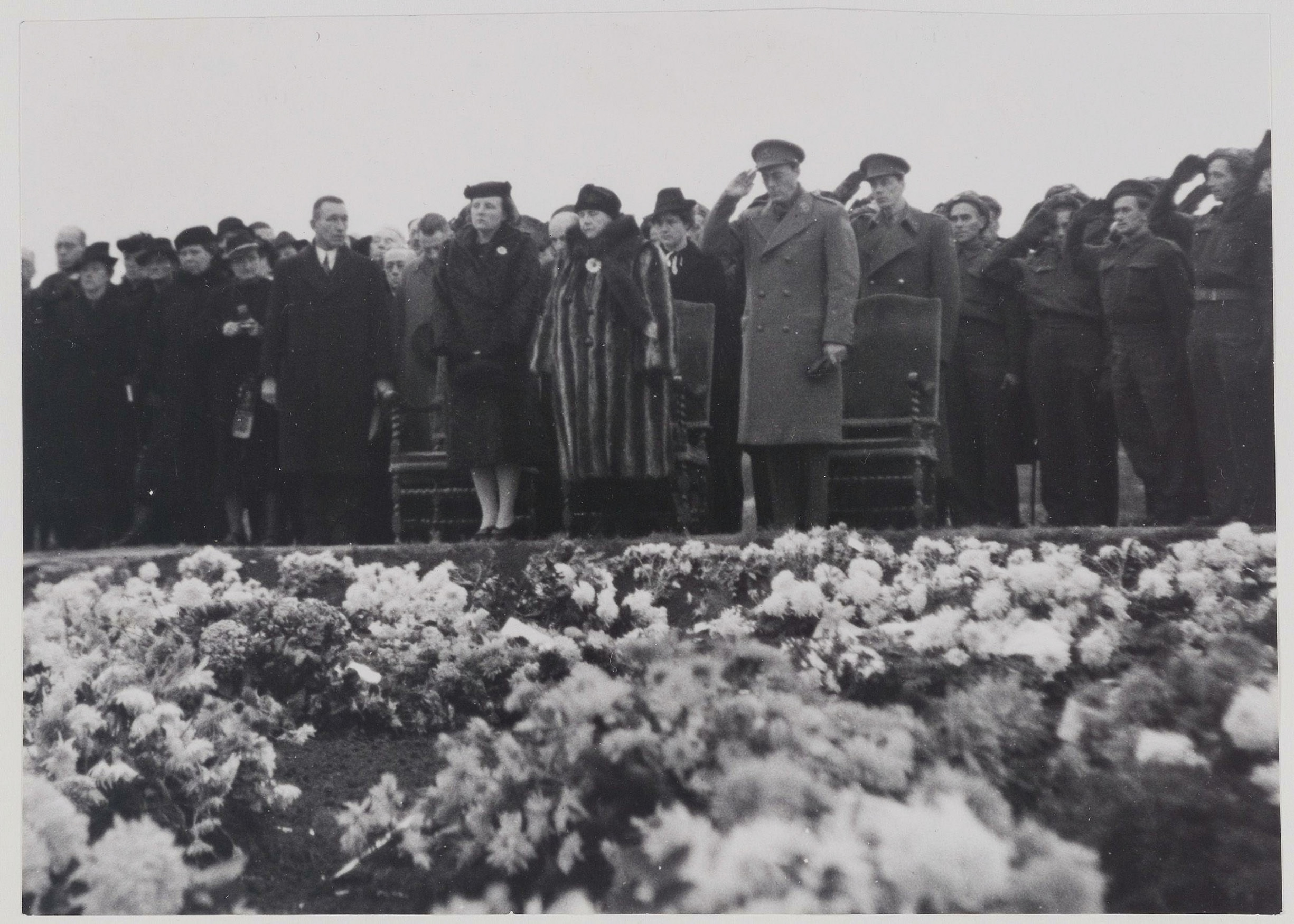
Funeral of Hannie Schaft in the presence of Queen Wilhelmina, Princess Juliana and Prince Bernhard on November 27, 1945. Image collection of the municipality of Haarlem

Although Schaft's supposed final words became famous, they were never confirmed. A Dutch World War II historian said a search through the Dutch archives does not ever mention Schaft saying "I shoot better!" During a post-war interrogation, Kuiper said he had been talking to Schaft when he suddenly heard a gunshot after which she cried out in pain and started shaking. Realizing that Schmitz had only grazed her, Kuiper took out his submachine gun and fired a burst at Schaft, after which she immediately collapsed. One of the shots hit her in the head, killing her. It was the Dutch novelist Theun de Vries who added Schaft's last words as a poetic license in his book The Girl With the Red Hair (Het meisje met het rode haar, 1956).

On 27 November 1945, Schaft was reburied in a state funeral at the Dutch Honorary Cemetery Bloemendaal. Members of the Dutch government and royal family attended, including Queen Wilhelmina, who called Schaft "the symbol of the Resistance".

== Legacy ==
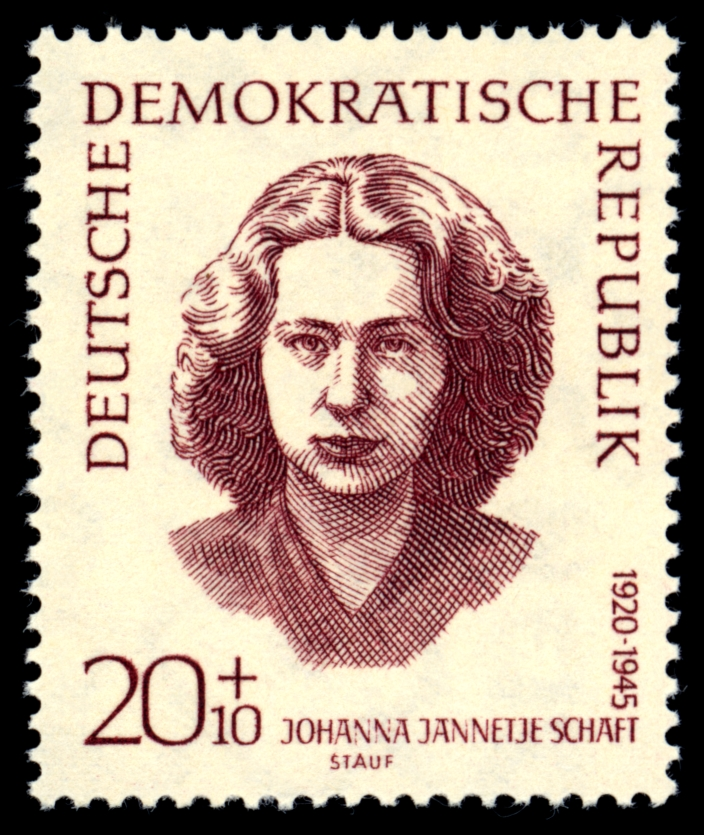
Postage stamp from East Germany portraying Hannie Schaft

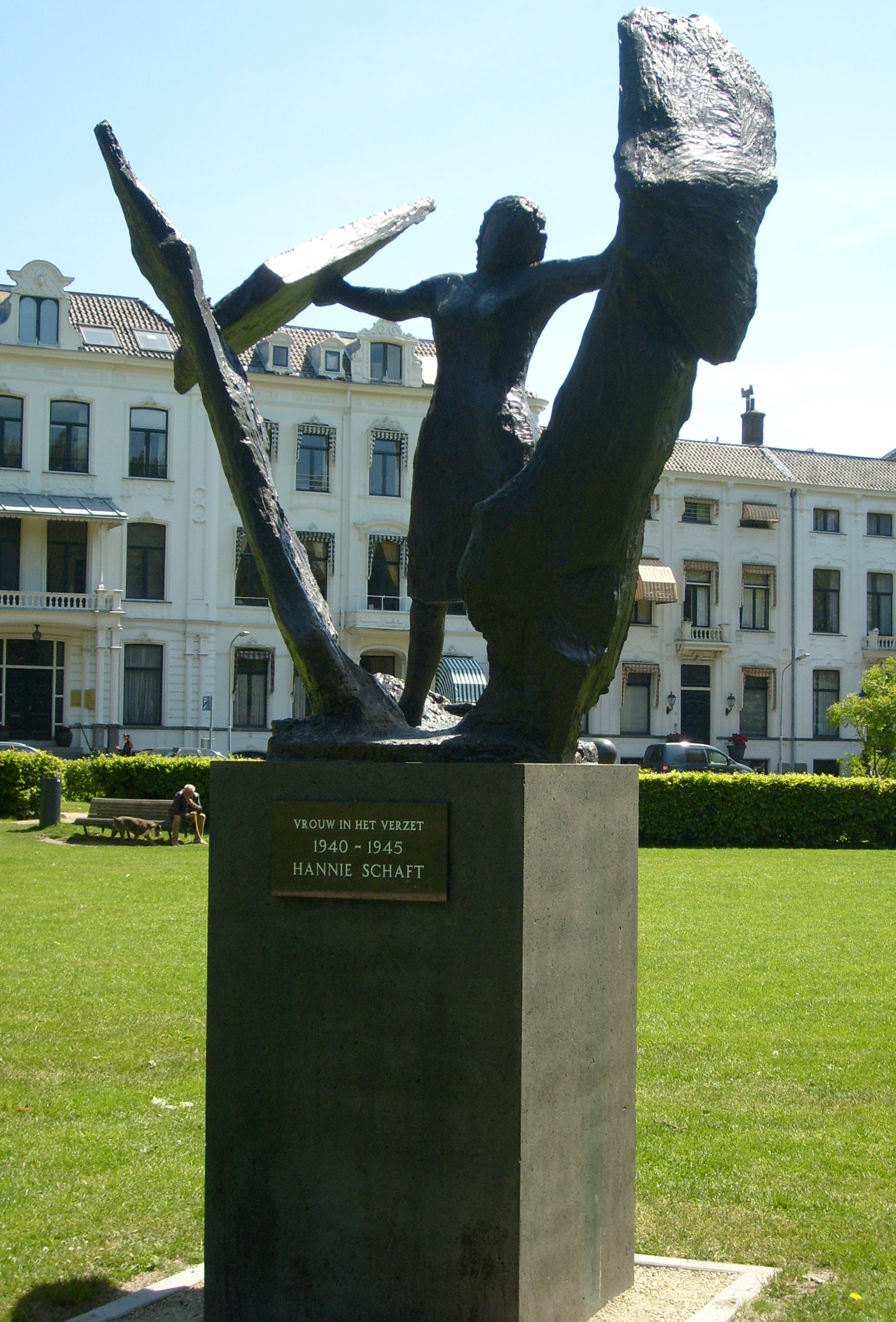
Monument to Hannie Schaft in the Kenaupark, Haarlem

It is not known if Schmitz was ever prosecuted. However, Kuiper and Lages were prosecuted for war crimes by Dutch courts. Kuiper was found guilty, sentenced to death, and executed in 1948. Lages was convicted and sentenced to death in 1949. His sentence was confirmed in 1950. However, Lages was never executed since Queen Juliana, who had become increasingly reluctant to authorize death sentences, refused to sign his death warrant. This was opposed by the Dutch Cabinet, and there were large public protests against the possibility of amnesty for Lages. With the Queen unwilling to change her mind, Lages's sentence was commuted to life in prison in 1952. He eventually became one of "The Breda Four", one of the last four Nazi war criminals, all of whom were on death row, but eventually reprieved due to Juliana's hesitance, still serving time in the Netherlands. In a decision which sparked public outcry, Lages was released from prison on health grounds in 1966, on the order of Minister of Justice Ivo Samkalden. Lages returned to Germany, where he died in 1971.

After the war, the remains of 422 members of the resistance were found in the Bloemendaal dunes, 421 men and one woman, Hannie Schaft. She was reburied in section 22 at the honorary cemetery Erebegraafplaats Bloemendaal in the dunes in Overveen in the presence of Princess Juliana and her husband Prince Bernard. Later, as queen, Juliana unveiled a bronze commemorative statue in the Kenau Park in nearby Haarlem, her birthplace.

Posthumously Schaft received the Dutch Cross of Resistance, one of only 95 people. She was also awarded the Resistance Memorial Cross and General Eisenhower awarded her the Medal of Freedom.

Because the Communist Party of the Netherlands celebrated her as an icon, the commemoration at Hannie's grave was forbidden in 1951. The commemorators (who were estimated to number over 10,000) were stopped by several hundred police and military with the aid of four tanks. A group of seven managed to circumvent the blockade and reached the burial ground, but were arrested when they tolled the bell. From the next year on, the communists decided to prevent another such scene by holding their commemoration in Haarlem instead.

A number of schools and streets in the Netherlands are named after her. For her, and other resistance heroines, a foundation has been created: the National Hannie Schaft Foundation (Dutch: Nationale Hannie Schaft Stichting). A number of books and movies have been made about her. She features in The Assault (De Aanslag, 1982) by Harry Mulisch, also released as a movie directed by Fons Rademakers. Ineke Verdoner wrote a song about her. Author Theun de Vries wrote a biography of her life, The Girl with the Red Hair, which inspired the 1981 movie of the same title by Ben Verbong featuring Renée Soutendijk as Hannie Schaft. Her life is the basis of the 2023 historical novel, To Die Beautiful by Buzzy Jackson. She is remembered each year in November during a national event held in Haarlem.

In the early 1990s, thanks to the Hannie Schaft Memorial Foundation, commemorations were once again permitted. The last Sunday of each November in the Netherlands is a day of remembrance for Schaft's life and work.

== See also ==
- Freddie Oversteegen
- Truus Menger-Oversteegen
