= Willem Sandberg =

Dutch typographer (1897–1984)

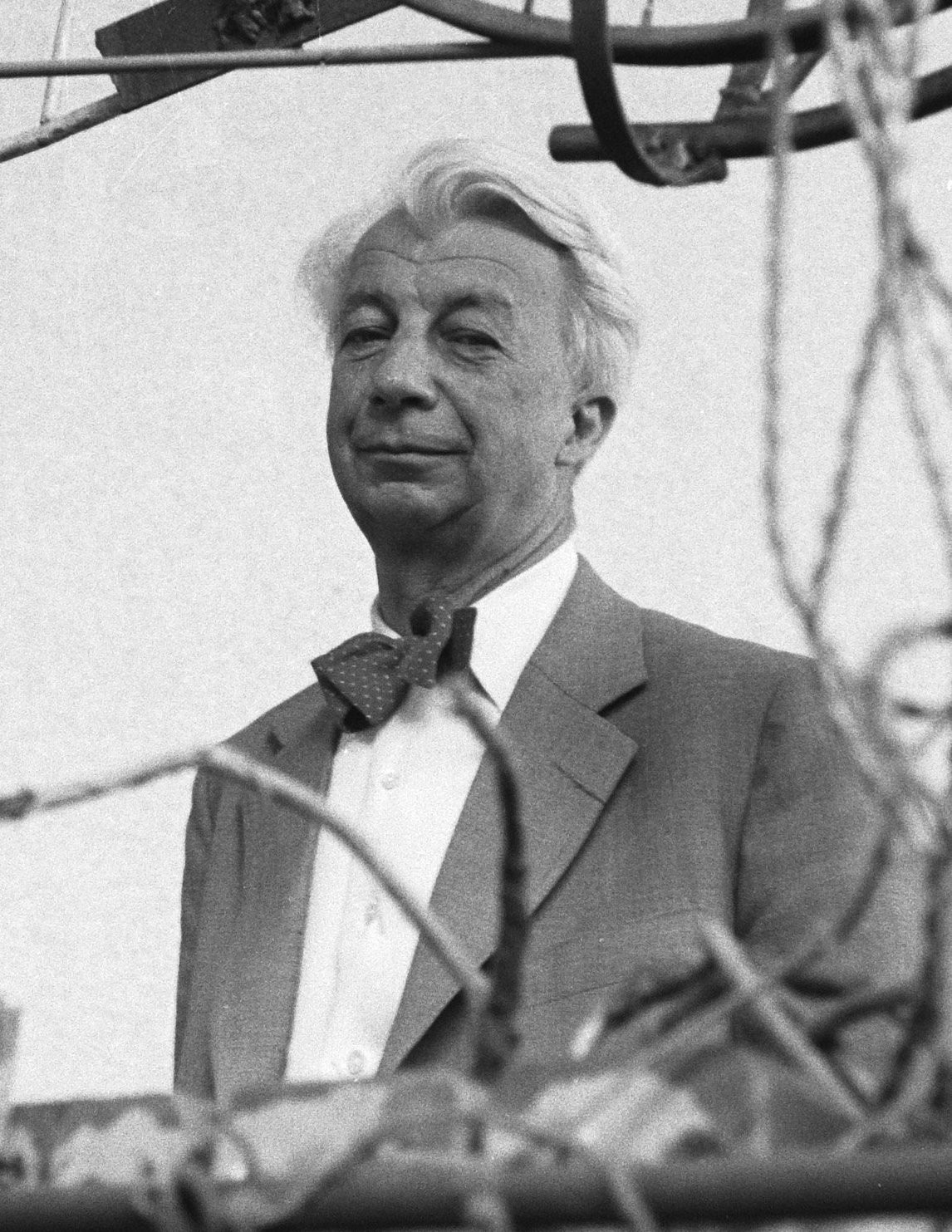
- Born: 24 October 1897; Amersfoort
- Died: 8 April 1984 (aged 86); Amsterdam
- Occupation: Graphic designer, curator, designer, typographer, art historian, art curator, graphic artist, drawer, postage stamp designer, writer, aristocracy, muralist, typesetter
- Awards: Erasmus Prize (1975); Righteous Among the Nations (Netherlands, 1968); Honorary Royal Designer for Industry (1971); Museummedal of the City of Amsterdam (1962); Officer of the Order of Orange-Nassau (1960); Officer of the French Order of Academic Palms (1939); Chevalier of the Legion of Honour (1947); Knight of the Order of the Polar Star (1961); H.N. Werkman Award (1957)
- Position held: museum director

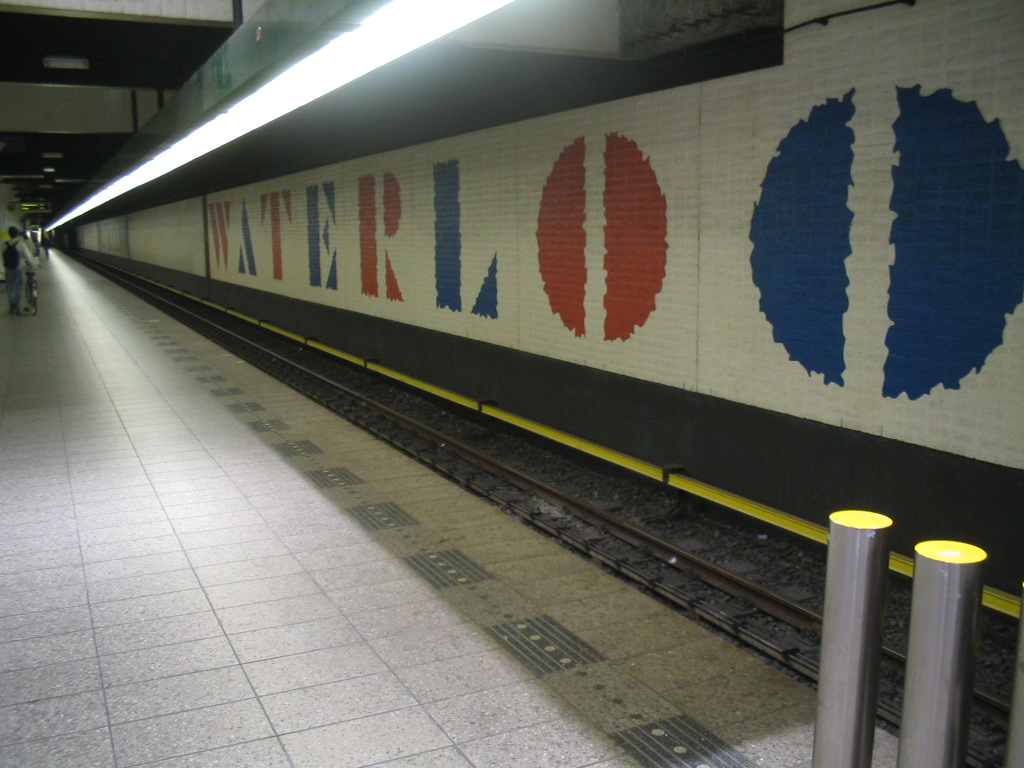
Waterlooplein metro station featuring an example of Sandberg's typography

Jonkheer Willem Jacob Henri Berend Sandberg (24 October 1897 – 8 April 1984) was a Dutch typographer, museum curator, and member of the Dutch resistance during World War II.

== Early life and career ==
Sandberg was born in Amersfoort in 1897 and studied art in Amsterdam. He became a follower of the Mazdaznan movement. As a young man he traveled, serving as an apprentice to a printer in Herrliberg, Switzerland. In 1927, he visited Vienna, where he studied Otto Neurath's Isotype system at the Gesellschafts- und Wirtschaftsmuseum. At this time, he also visited the Dessau Bauhaus and met Naum Gabo, a pioneer of kinetic art.

Returning to Amsterdam, Sandberg started work as a graphic designer, utilizing his printing skills and Neurath's Isotype system. In 1928, he started a long relationship with the Stedelijk Museum, and in 1932 became a member of VANK, the Dutch Society for Arts and Crafts. He soon joined the committee that determined the exhibitions of the museum. From 1937 to 1941, he served as the museum's curator of modern art.

== Participation in the Dutch resistance ==
During the Second World War, Sandberg was active in the Dutch resistance movement, preparing forged documents for Jews and others wanted by the Gestapo. Other prominent individuals in the Raad van Verzet (Resistance Council) included painter and author Willem Arondeus, sculptors Gerrit van der Veen and Frits van Hall, cellist Frieda Belinfante, poet Martinus Nijhoff, dancer Suzy van Hall, lawyer Lau Mazirel, and composer and conductor Jan van Gilse. Within a short time, the Nazis began to expose the false documents by comparing the names with those in the local population registry. To hinder the Nazis, on 27 March 1943, Sandberg was among those who took part in planning the bombing of the Amsterdam Public Records Office. Thousands of files were destroyed, and the attempt to compare forged documents with the registry was hindered. Arondeus and ten others were later arrested and executed by firing squad. His wife and son were arrested and incarcerated for several months.

From December 1943 to April 1945, Sandberg went into hiding as Henri Willem van den Bosch to avoid arrest. During his time on the run, he formulated the Experimenta Typographica, a series of 19 experimental typography pamphlets.

For his participation in the resistance movement and helping to save the lives of Jews during the war, Sandberg was recognized as Righteous Among The Nations on 26 November 1968.

== Contributions to the Stedelijk Museum ==
Sandberg began working for the Stedelijk Museum in 1928 and was appointed curator in 1937. During his tenure as curator, Sandberg expanded the museum and developed new exhibition techniques, for which he gained international renown. He applied his graphic design and typography skills to over 300 catalogues. After the war, he served as director of the museum until his retirement in 1962.

In his retirement, he served on the committees for the Beaubourg in Paris and the Israel Museum in Jerusalem.

The Sandberg Institute, part of the Gerrit Rietveld Academy of Art and Design, bears his name.
