= 1943 Amsterdam civil registry office bombing =

Dutch resistance attack during WWII

Coordinates: 52°22′N 4°55′E

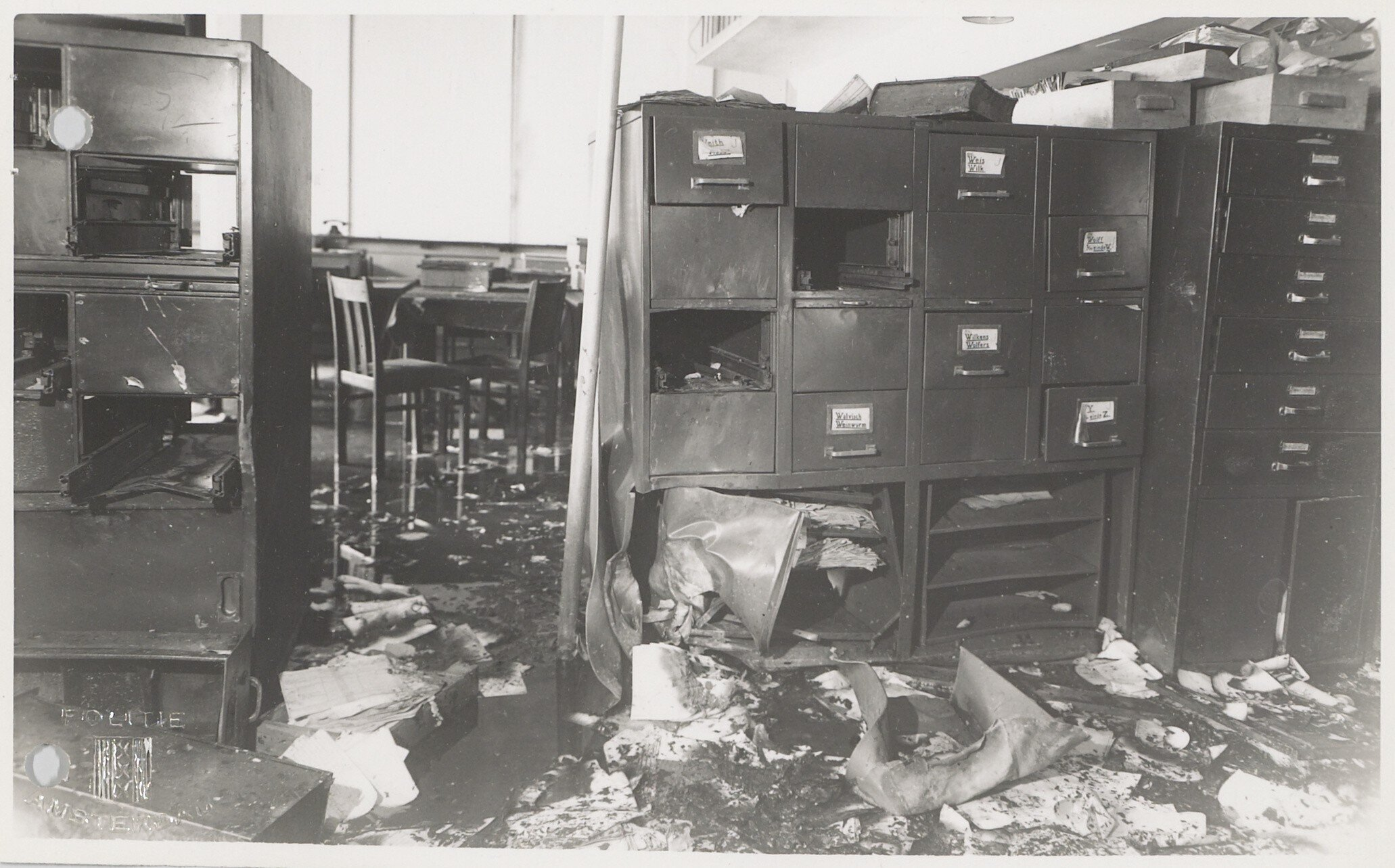
The Amsterdam civil registry office, the day after the bombing

The 1943 bombing of the Amsterdam civil registry office was an attempt by members of the Dutch resistance to destroy the Amsterdam civil registry (bevolkingsregister), in order to prevent the German occupiers from identifying Jews and others marked for persecution, arrest or forced labour. The March 1943 assault was only partially successful, and led to the execution of 12 participants. Nevertheless, the action likely saved many Jews from arrest and deportation to Nazi extermination camps.

== Background ==
Following the 1940 German invasion and occupation of the Netherlands, everyone aged 15 and older was required to carry an identification card, the persoonsbewijs, with them at all times. Jews had to carry a persoonsbewijs marked with a large J. Resistance members soon started to forge identification cards on a large scale – the largest such operation, led by Gerrit van der Veen, produced some 80,000 forged documents. However, forged documents could be easily detected because they could be compared against the records in the civil registries. Some civil servants were willing to falsify records in the civil registry so that they would match up with forged identification cards. Nevertheless, the civil registries remained a potent weapon in the hands of the Nazis to identify members of the Dutch population who were Jewish, as well as potential members of the resistance or people who could be called up for forced labour duty.

In 1943, a group of resistance members, led by sculptor Gerrit van der Veen and painter and author Willem Arondeus, meticulously planned to carry out a sabotage attack on the Amsterdam civil registry office, with the aim to destroy the records, without causing any loss of life. The mission was particularly difficult because security at civil registries had been tightened up after a similar assault on an office in Wageningen in late 1942. Security guards were now posted at strategic locations in the Amsterdam civil registry office. The group preparing the attack included a number of local artists and medical students, including several Jews and homosexuals, as well as a group of resistance members behind the clandestine publication Rattenkruid.

== Bombing ==
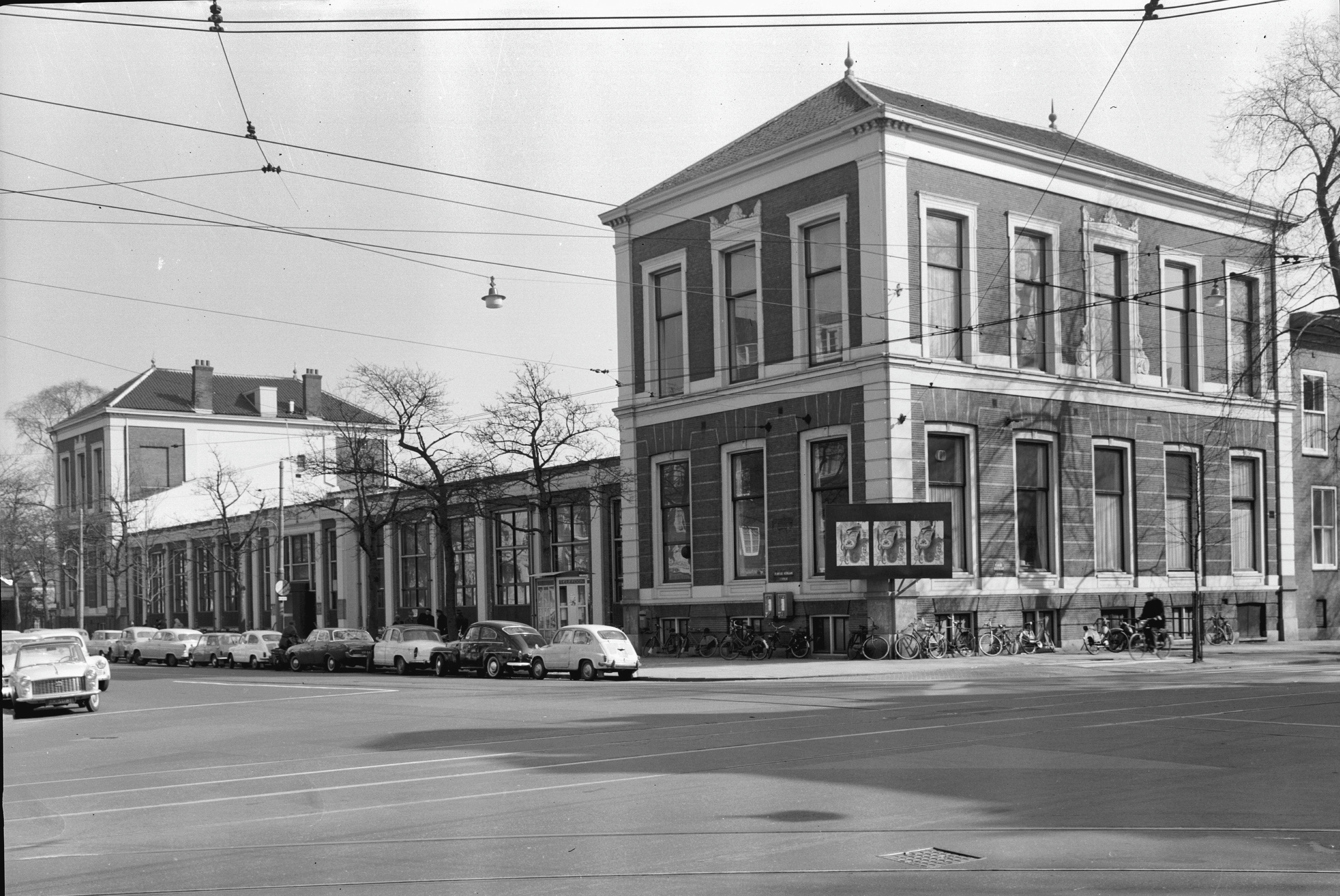
The office seen from outside, corner of Plantage Kerklaan and Plantage Middenlaan

The assault on the civil registry office at Plantage Kerklaan 36, a former concert hall directly adjacent to the main entrance of Artis zoo, took place on the night of 27 March 1943. Disguised in police uniforms, the resistance group approached the security guards and told them that they had come to search the building for explosives. The guards believed their story and let them in. Two medical students then sedated the guards by injecting them with phenobarbital, and the unconscious guards were carried inside the zoo through a back door.

Once inside the building, the resistance members pulled open all the drawers, piled all of the documents onto the floor and doused them with benzene. They then set off a series of timed explosions, using explosives obtained by resistance operatives from a munitions store at Naarden fortress.

The explosions set the building ablaze. The fire department (which had been tipped off about the assault) eventually arrived, but delayed putting out the fire. When they did ultimately come into action, they completely doused the building in water in an attempt to cause additional water damage to the records.

The daring assault had a significant psychological impact on the residents of Amsterdam as well as the German occupiers. However, it was only partially successful in destroying the civil registry. Only 15% of the records were completely destroyed. In total, 800,000 identity cards were destroyed, and 600 blank cards and 50,000 guilders were removed from the building.

== Aftermath ==
Following the bombing, the Reichskommissariat Niederlande immediately offered a 10,000 guilder reward to whomever could identify the perpetrators of the assault. Within a week, most of the conspirators had been betrayed to the Nazi-run government and arrested. When Willem Arondeus was arrested in April, he did not reveal the names of his co-conspirators. However the Germans found a notebook in his apartment listing many of the names, which led to the arrest of most of the resistance members who participated in the assault.

The trial against the resistance members who carried out the assault took place in June 1943 at the Tropenmuseum. Willem Arondeus and 13 others were found guilty and sentenced to death. Two received clemency at the last minute; the other 12 were executed on 2 July 1943. Gerrit van Veen managed to escape capture and continued his resistance activities until his 1944 arrest and execution following an assault on an Amsterdam prison.

Attorney and co-conspirator Lau Mazirel visited Willem Arondeus in prison shortly before he was executed for his role in the assault. Arondeus, who was openly gay, asked her to "tell the world that homosexuals are no less courageous than anyone else." Mazirel went on to become an early proponent of LGBT rights. At the trial, the defense claimed mitigating circumstances for Sjoerd Bakker, Arondeus' partner, claiming that Arondeus had encouraged Bakker to participate since they were allegedly involved in an emotional relationship. However, Bakker refuted that claim and was sentenced to death along with the others.

== Remembrance ==
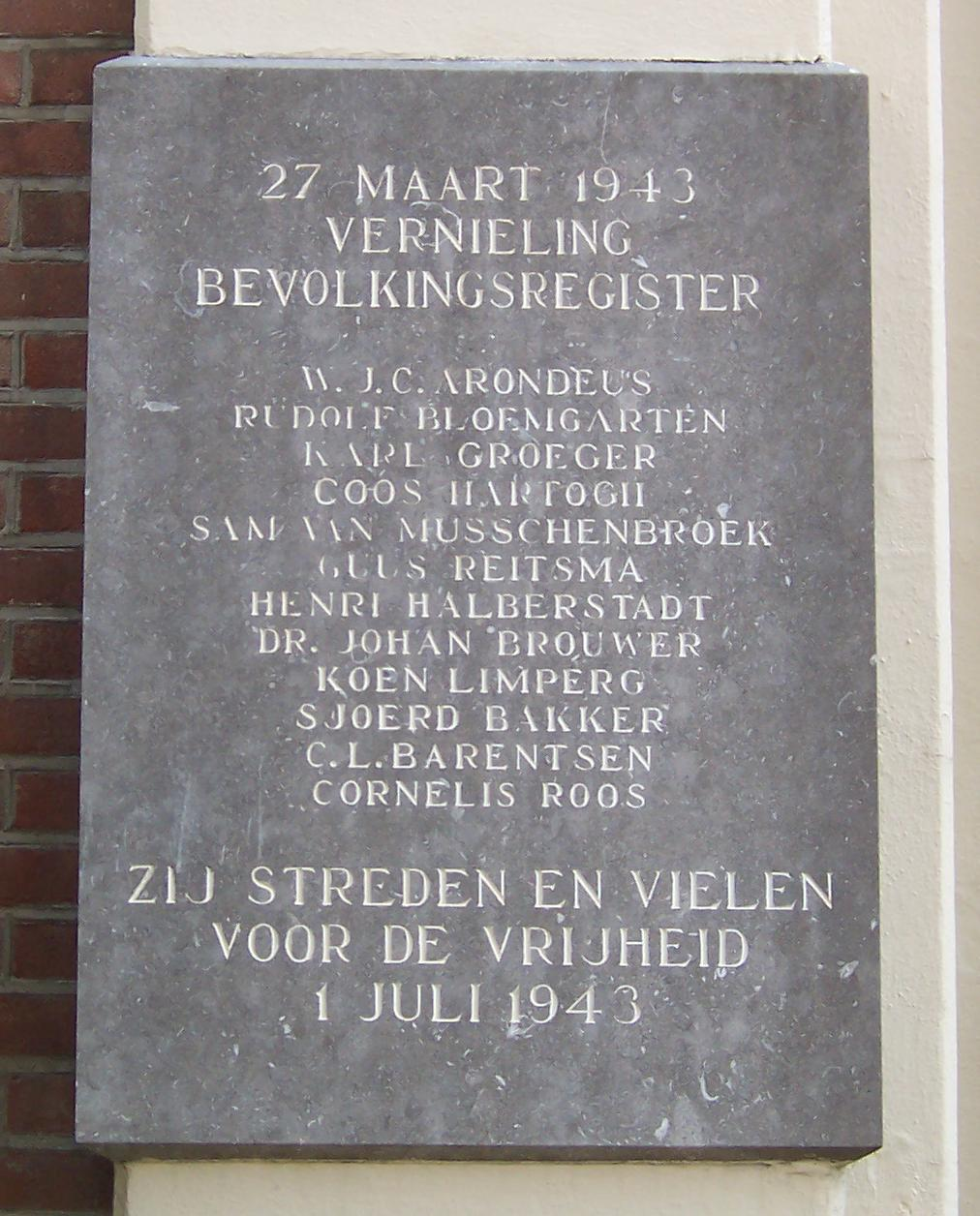
Commemorative plaque at Plantage Kerklaan 36

On 4 augustus 1945, a commemorative plaque designed by Willem Sandberg was affixed next to the front door of the building at Plantage Kerklaan 36, in remembrance of the assault and the resistance members who were executed for their role in it. The plaque lists the names of the 12 participants who were executed following the bombing.

Many of the participants were later honoured by the state of Israel with the title Righteous Among the Nations. In 1984, each member of the group involved in the attack was honoured by Queen Beatrix of the Netherlands and awarded the Resistance Memorial Cross (Verzetsherdenkingskruis)

In 2018 the Verzetsmuseum (Resistance Museum) on Plantage Kerklaan in Amsterdam, across the street from the former civil registry office, held an exhibition to mark the 75th anniversary of the bombing. Visitors were taken through the story of six resistance fighters involved in the attack via a 3D audio tour in twelve consecutive rooms. Sound, light, and spatial design immersed the public in the dilemmas and choices of the resistance. The exhibition won a European Design Award for its design.

In 2023, NPS' Schooltv broadcast an educational documentary about the attack on the Amsterdam civil registry. The documentary, part of the program EenVandaag in de klas, focuses on telling schoolchildren the story of this act of resistance. The documentary emphasizes the life-saving impact of the action. Using archival footage and interviews, it makes the story accessible to a young audience while also discussing the moral dilemmas and dangers of resistance activity.

In 2025, the musical Willem & Frieda: Roze Verzet premiered at the DeLaMar Theater in Amsterdam as part of the cultural program surrounding Pride Amsterdam. The production tells the story of Arondéus and Belinfante, with particular attention to their queer identities and the historical attack of 27 March 1943. In the musical, the attack is presented as an act of moral courage and artistic resistance, with the roles of other participants also addressed.

The events were covered in the documentary Willem and Frieda: Defying the Nazis hosted by Stephen Fry and broadcast on Channel 4 in March 2023.

The attack also features prominently in biographical literature: Een schitterend vergeten leven (Toni Boumans, 2015) and Het leven van Willem Arondéus (Rudi van Dantzig, 2003) tell the story from the perspective of individual participants.

== Participants ==
=== Executed ===
- Willem Arondeus, painter and author
- Johan Brouwer (Johannes), an historian
- Rudi Bloemgarten (Rudolf), a medical student
- Karl Gröger
- Coos Hartogh
- Sam van Musschenbroek
- Guus Reitsma
- Henri Halberstadt
- Koen Limperg (Koenraad), an architect
- Sjoerd Bakker, a tailor who made the police uniforms that were used as a disguise
- Cornelis Leendert Barentsen
- Cornelis Roos

=== Other participants ===
- Gerrit van der Veen, escaped, arrested and executed in 1944
- Cees Honig, a medical student, sedated the security guards, sent to Dachau concentration camp but survived
- Willem Beck, a medical student, sedated the security guards, sent to Dachau concentration camp but survived
- Frieda Belinfante, helped prepare the assault, fled to Switzerland and survived
- Willem Sandberg, helped prepare the assault, went into hiding and survived
- Martinus Nijhoff, helped prepare the assault, evaded arrest
- Maarten van Gilse, helped prepare the assault, executed in September 1943 with 17 other members of the CS-6 resistance group
- Lau Mazirel, helped prepare the assault, arrested in 1944 but released

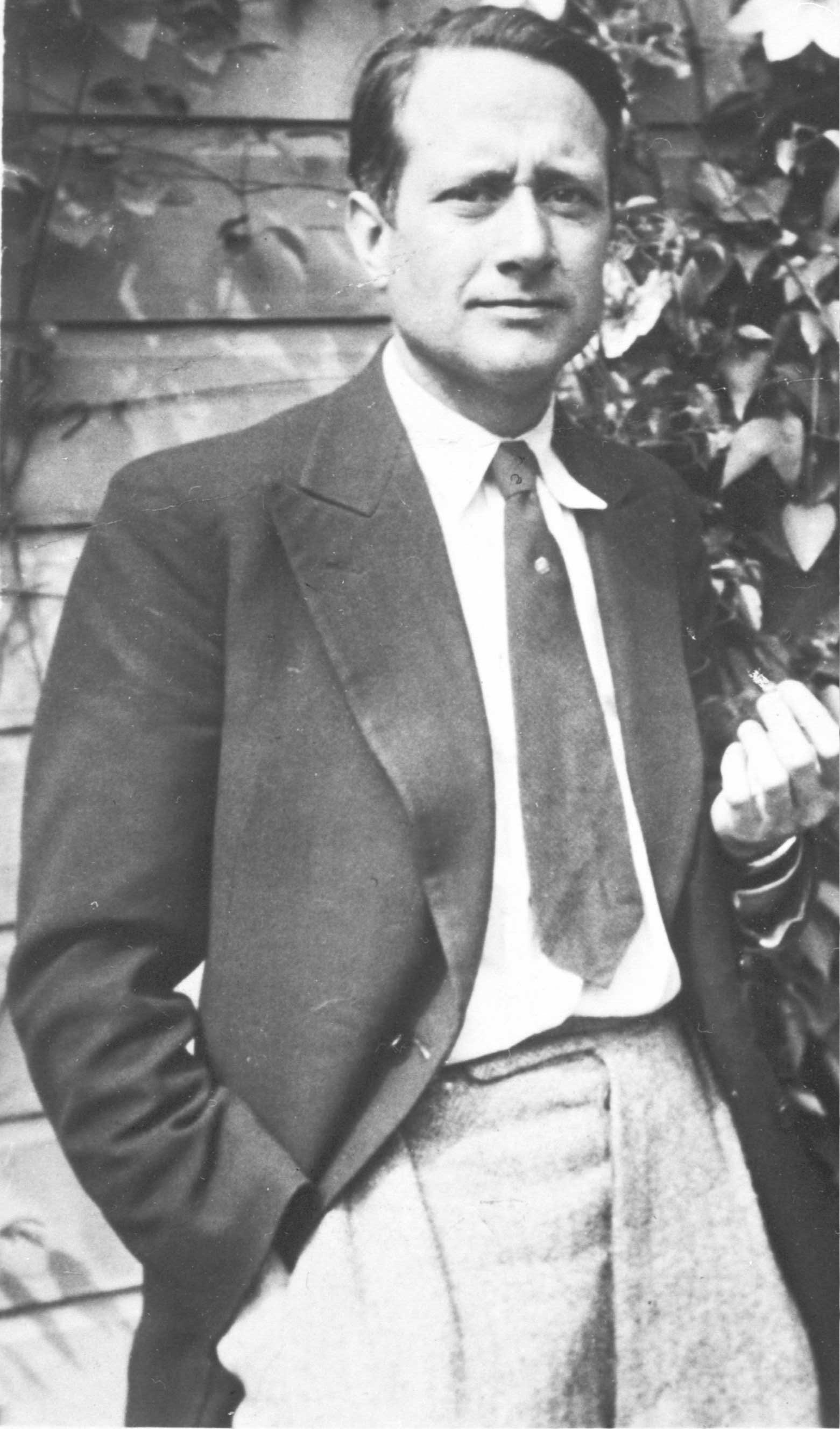
Gerrit van der Veen, 1940

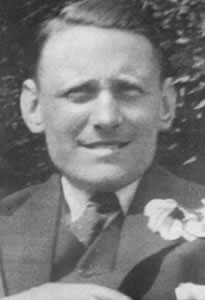
Willem Arondeus

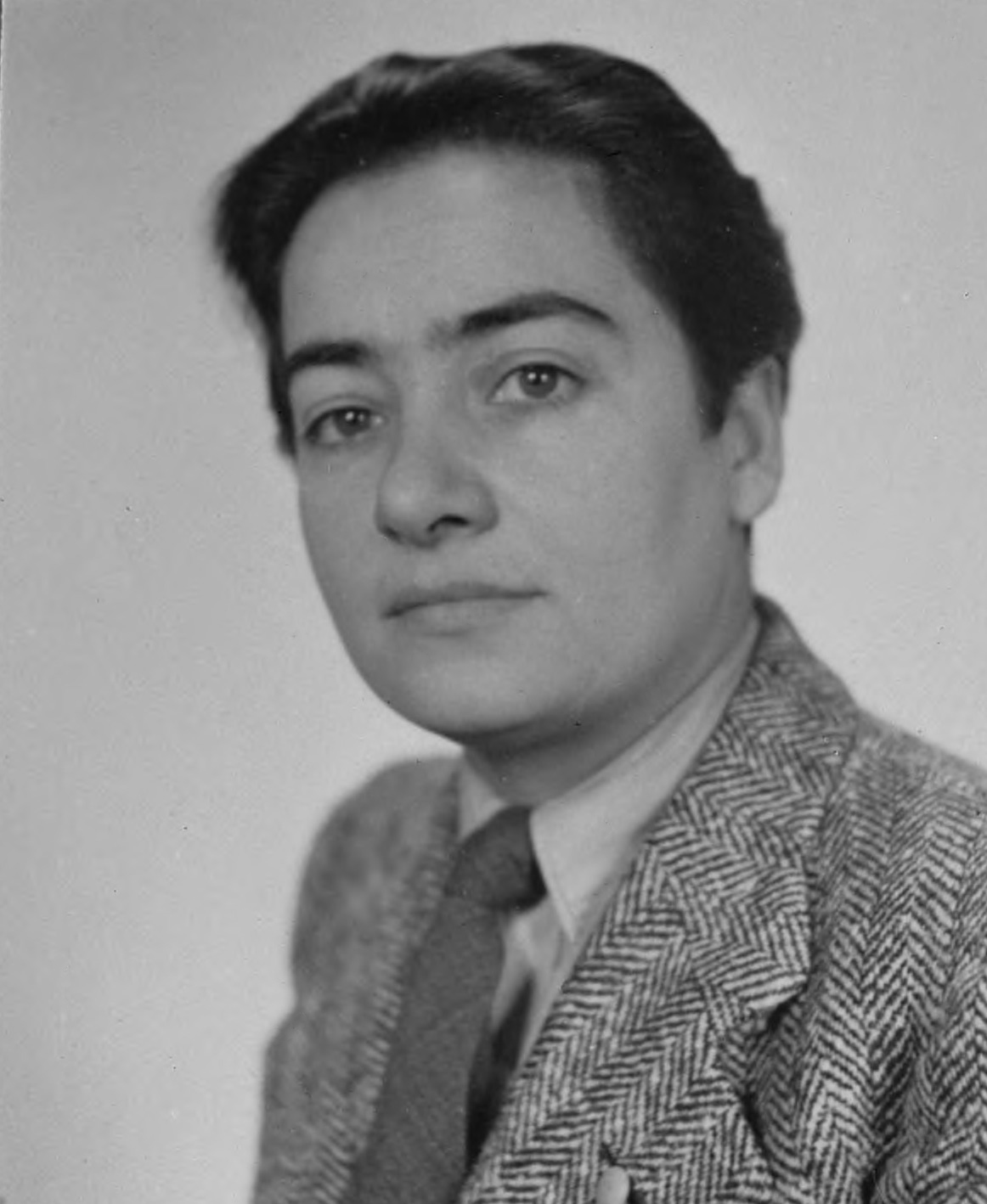
Frieda Belinfante, 1943

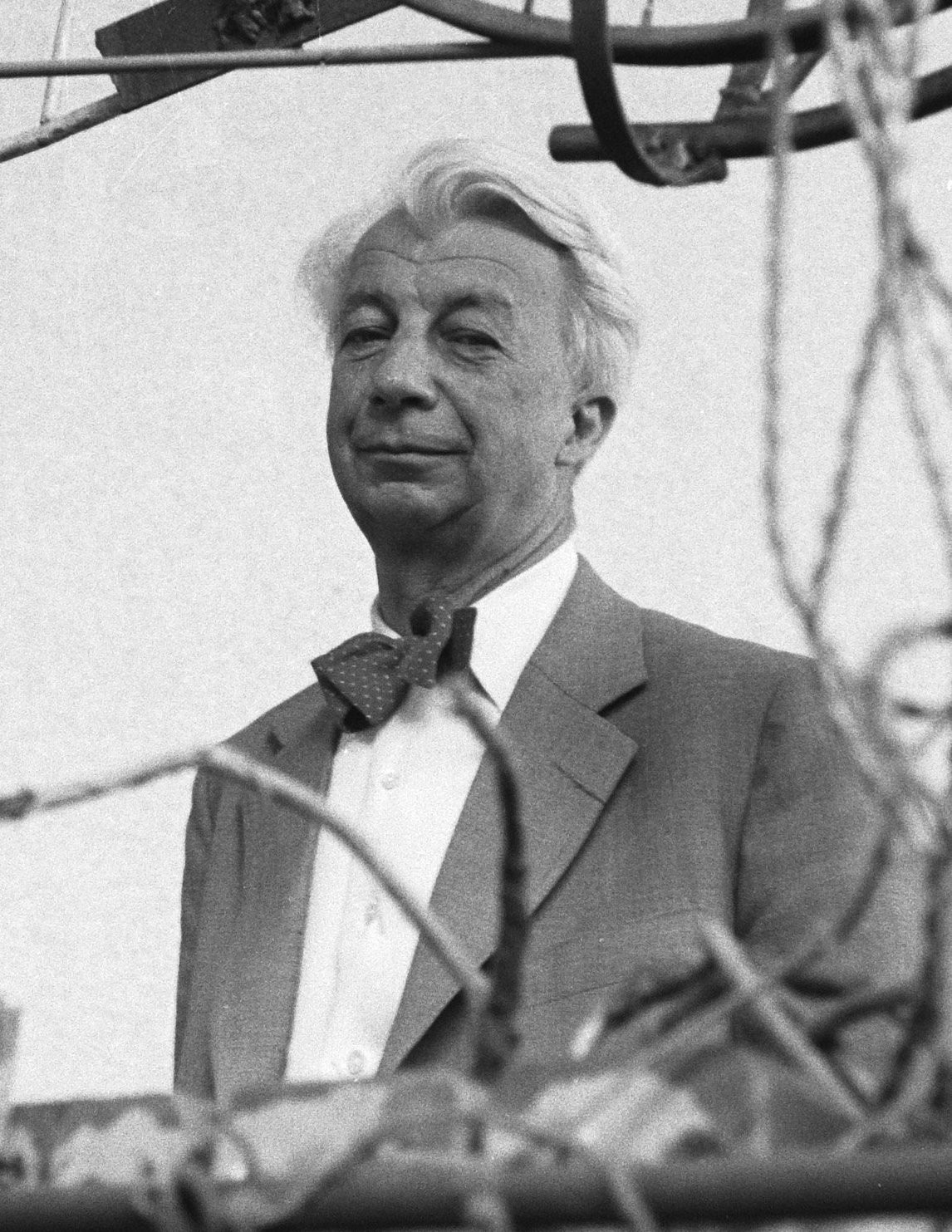
Willem Sandberg

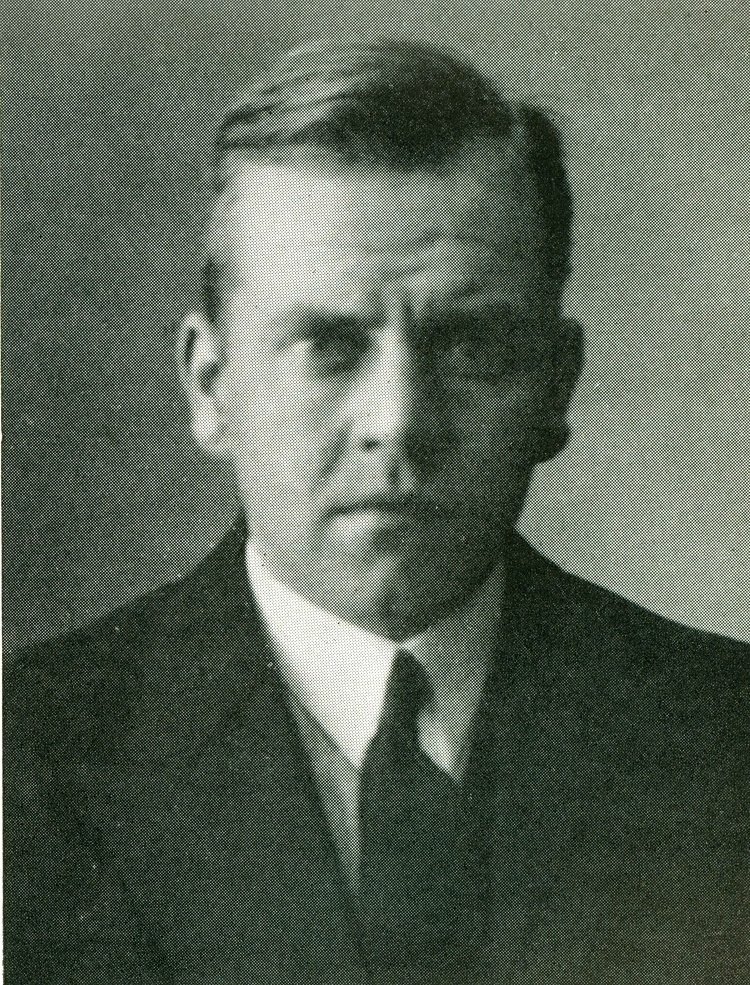
Martinus Nijhoff
