= Karl Gröger =

Dutch resistance member (1918–1943)

- Born: 7 February 1918; Vienna, Austria
- Died: 1 July 1943 (aged 25) near Overveen, Netherlands
- Cause of death: Execution by firing squad
- Known for: Member of Dutch Resistance during World War II
- Awards: Righteous Among the Nations

Karl Gröger (German: [kaʁl ˈɡʁøːɡɐ]; 7 February 1918 - 1 July 1943) was a member of a Dutch resistance group executed in 1943.

In collaboration with a Dutch resistance group, he destroyed the registration of address office of Amsterdam, thereby destroying file cards of Dutch people which would have faced forced labour and deportation to concentration camps.

In 1943 the SS and police court sentenced him to death in The Hague.

He was given the title "Righteous Among the Nations" in 1986 by Yad Vashem.

== Family ==
Karl Gröger was born 7 February 1918 in Vienna, Austria, to Frieda Neuhauser Groeger and Karl Groeger.

His mother, Frieda (9/03/1887 Vinkovcze,(?)Croatia. d. 1975, Chicago, Il. U S A.), was the child of two Jewish parents, Josef Neuhauser and Karolina Neuhauser nee Spitzer. Frieda had herself baptized as Roman Catholic in order to further her budding career as an opera singer. She appeared as a Valkyrie in Wagner's most famous opera at the Stadtsopera in Vienna in 1914.

His father was Karl Groeger (1883, Vienna, Austria 1883.d. 1967, Chicago, Il.U.S.A.). Karl Groeger Sr. was the son of a Jewish mother, Anna, and a Gentile father. He was also baptized at some point, but a Taufschein or baptism certificate has been lost. Karl Sr. studied law and became a high profile attorney in Viennese society, sometimes representing men who would later become known Nazis during the Third Reich.

Freida and Karl Sr. had two children; Karl Jr or ' Munkie" and four years later, a daughter, Marianne, who died at age three in a Typhus epidemic.

== Student life ==
He participated in the association of social democratic high school students. After that he studied medicine at the University of Vienna. Following his graduation in March 1938, Gröger fled to Amsterdam, where he continued his medicine study.

== War years ==
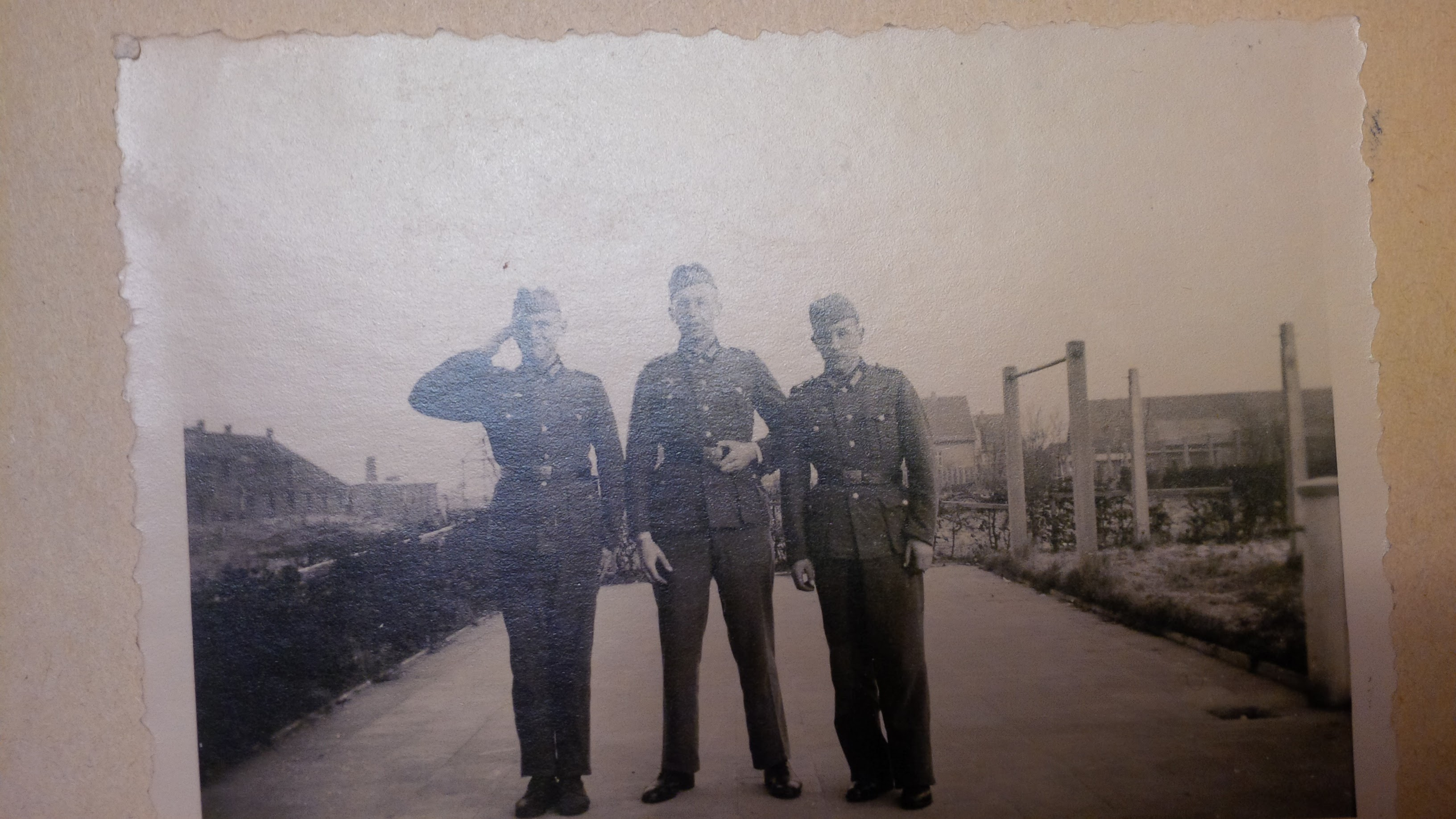
Karl Jr. 1941, after being inducted into the German army as a Physician Officer.

Two years later, in May 1940, the German Wehrmacht marched into the Netherlands. He had to join the German Army. After some months the army discharged him because he was discovered to be of Jewish descent.

Unbeknownst to the Germans, Karl (Bubie as he was known to friends and Munkie as he was known to his parents), was the product of a full Jewish mother (who converted into the Catholic faith in 1911) and of a half-Jewish father. Their son, Karl Gröger, Jr. was actually baptized into the Catholic faith at birth.

== Resistance activities ==
Gröger joined the resistance movement of Gerrit van der Veen, a sculptor. Karl also worked for the underground newspaper "Rattenkruit" (rat poison).

Following the 1940 German invasion and occupation of the Netherlands, everyone aged 15 and older was required to carry an identification card, the persoonsbewijs, with them at all times. Jews had to carry a persoonsbewijs marked with a large J. Resistance members soon started to forge identification cards at a large scale – the largest such operation, led by Gerrit van der Veen, produced some 80,000 forged documents. However, forged documents could be easily detected because they could be compared against the records in the civil registries. Some civil servants were willing to falsify records in the civil registry so that they would match up with forged identification cards. Nevertheless, the civil registries remained a potent weapon in the hands of the Nazis to identify members of the Dutch population who were Jewish, potential members of the resistance or could be called up for forced labour duty.

In 1943, a group of resistance members, led by sculptor Gerrit van der Veen and painter and author Willem Arondeus, meticulously planned to carry out a sabotage attack on the Amsterdam civil registry office, with the aim to destroy the records, without causing any loss of life. The mission was particularly difficult because security at civil registries had been tightened up after a similar assault on an office in Wageningen in late 1942. Security guards were now posted at strategic locations in the Amsterdam civil registry office. The group preparing the attack included a number of local artists and medical students, including several Jews and homosexuals, as well as a group of resistance members behind the clandestine publication Rattenkruid.

On March 28, 1943 he took part in the assault against Amsterdam’s registration of address office. Gröger's resistance group broke into the building dressed up as policemen. They fooled the guards and blasted the building. Through this act, thousands of file cards of Dutch people who would have been deported to concentration camps were destroyed.

== Bombing ==
The assault on the civil registry office at Plantage Kerklaan 36, a former concert hall directly adjacent to the main entrance of Artis zoo, took place on the night of 27 March 1943. Disguised in police uniforms, the resistance group approached the security guards and told them that they had come to search the building for explosives. The guards believed their story and let them in. Two medical students then sedated the guards by injecting them with phenobarbital, and the unconscious guards were carried inside the zoo through a back door.

Once inside the building, the resistance members pulled open all the drawers, piled all of the documents onto the floor and doused them with benzene. They then set off a series of timed explosions, using explosives obtained by resistance operatives from a munitions store at Naarden fortress.

The explosions set the building ablaze. The fire department (which had been tipped off about the assault) eventually arrived, but delayed putting out the fire. When they did ultimately come into action, they completely doused the building in water in an attempt to cause additional water damage to the records.

The daring assault had a significant psychological impact on the residents of Amsterdam as well as the Nazi occupiers. However, it was only partially successful in destroying the civil registry. Only 15% of the records were completely destroyed. In total, 800,000 identity cards were destroyed, and 600 blank cards and 50,000 guilders were removed from the building.

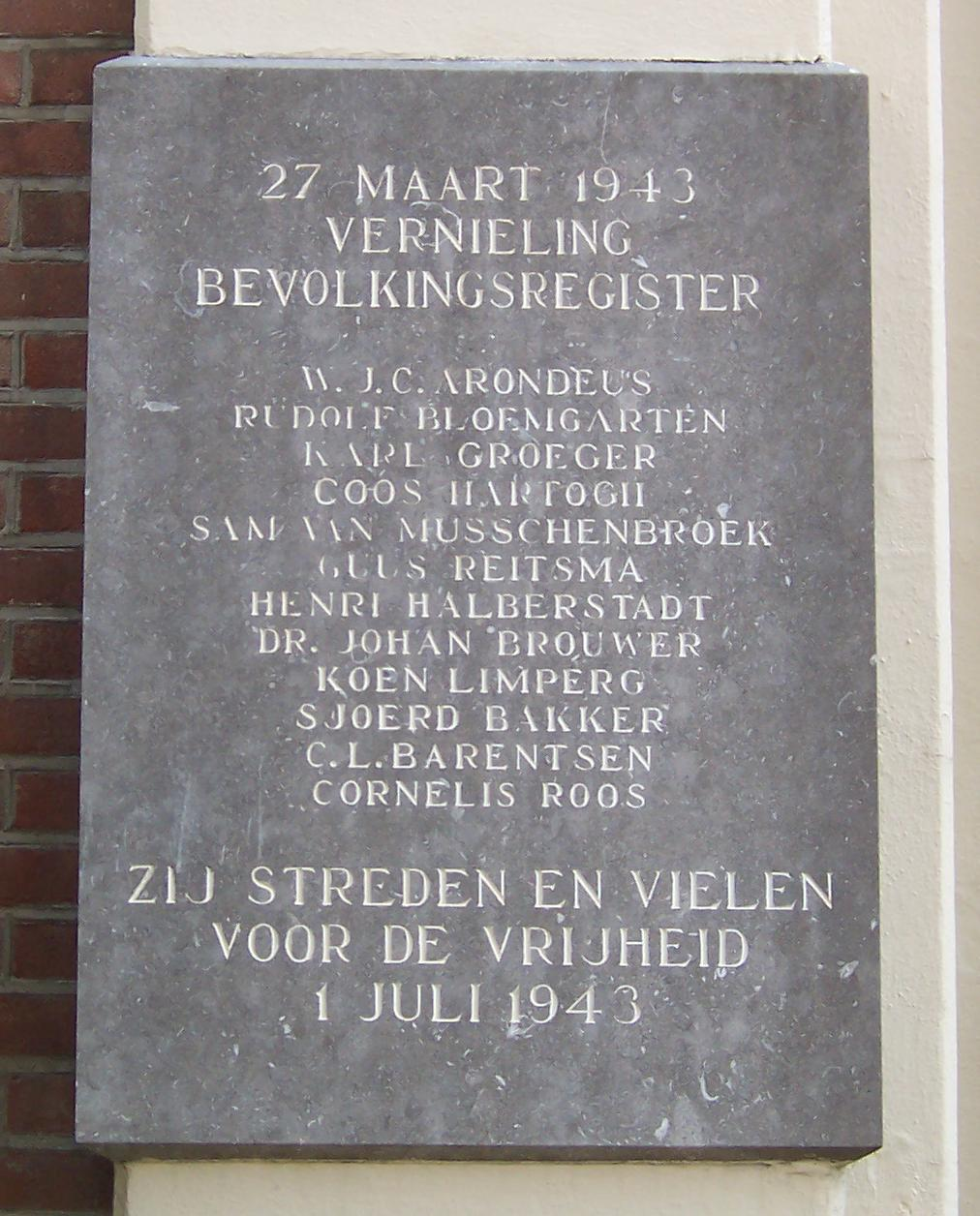
Memorial stone in Amsterdam

Afterwards, Gröger had to flee. He hid at a farm but was discovered by the SS when he sent a message to his girlfriend. He was arrested by the Gestapo and was brought to the Amsterdam police jail. He was sentenced to death by the SS and police court in The Hague in 1943. Because a mercy petition was refused by SS Reichsführer Heinrich Himmler, Gröger was executed with several of his companions in the dunes near Overveen.

Gröger told his lawyer that he hoped his actions would serve to establish a better relationship between the Netherlands and Germany.

Before his execution Gröger wrote in his farewell letter to his parents:

"Lovely mother, lovely father. I will be killed tomorrow. I really had to act like this. I had no other choice. God gave me the power to put up with the situation. I prepared myself for death. Above all I refused to feel hate or revenge. I will be tough with the help of God and will die as a man if he wants."

He also wrote "I believe that with this one action I brought more boon to humanity than an entire life as a physician would have done." (German: Ich glaube dass diese einzige Tat mehr Nutzen fur die Menscheit gebracht hat, als ein ganzes Leben als Arzt getan hätte). ( Original source Family documents, letter from Gestspo prison to his parents,)

== See also ==
- Righteous Among the Nations
