= Lau Mazirel =

Dutch attorney and activist

Lau Mazirel

Laura "Lau" Carola Mazirel (29 November 1907 in Utrecht – 20 November 1974 in Saint-Martin-de-la-Mer, France) was a member of the Dutch resistance during World War II who helped organise the 1943 bombing of the Amsterdam civil registry office. An attorney, she was an early proponent of LGBT rights and the rights of Romani people. She opposed civil marriage due to the then-inferior status of women, and also opposed registration of personal information, which she considered a violation of privacy.

== Biography ==
=== Pre-war period ===
Mazirel was a daughter of pacifists who helped refugees during World War I. She was raised in Gennep in the southern province of Limburg. In 1917, the family moved to Utrecht, where Mazirel found employment as a teacher, and also studied law and psychology. After her graduation in 1929, she moved to Amsterdam, where she became an active member of the social democratic student organisation Sociaal Democratische Studenten Club (SDSC) and the social democratic party Sociaal-Democratische Arbeiderspartij (SDAP). She also helped refugees from Nazi Germany.

In 1933 she married Meijer Leopold Waterman. However, it was a pro forma marriage, as Mazirel strongly opposed civil marriage because women at the time had few rights within the marriage and were required to obey their husband. She also opposed the divorce proceedings in place at that time, and considered the rights of a child born out of wedlock to be inadequately defined. The couple had two sons, Leo and Wolf.

In 1937 Mazirel started a law firm, focusing on cases involving refugees, families and immigrants. She also defended people accused under Article 248 bis, the law which banned homosexual contact between minors and adults.

In addition, Mazirel worked as tour guide, which led her to visit Paris during the 1937 world's fair and attend a large international conference where German scientists presented plans for a "racial hygienic cleansing". Alarmed by this, Mazirel visited "delousing camps" for Romani in Germany to gather information and take photographs. Her findings were not taken seriously in the Netherlands, however. She was also unsuccessful in persuading the Dutch government and Jewish religious institutions to remove information identifying a person's faith and other personal details from identification documents.

=== World War II ===
During the German occupation of the Netherlands in World War II, Mazirel remained active as an attorney. Her office on Prinsengracht canal served as a cover for resistance activities, such as making contact, passing along messages and providing shelter to refugees and people hiding from the Nazis (so-called onderduikers). She also hid several people from the Nazis in her own home.

As a pacifist, Mazirel was committed to nonviolent resistance. She joined the Vrije Groepen Amsterdam resistance groups, where she worked with her later second husband, Robert Hartog. She used falsified identification documents which identified her as perinatal nurse Noortje Wijnands. Her excellent command of German allowed her to make contact with high-ranking Nazi officers such as SS-Hauptsturmführer Ferdinand aus der Fünten.

As early as 1942, she was convinced that Westerbork was not a labour camp but a transit to the extermination camps. However, she failed to convince Abraham Asscher, chair of Amsterdam's Jewish Council, of this, even when she declared that she had obtained this information from Aus der Fünten himself. Soon after, her Jewish husband and their children Leo and Wolf were forced to go into hiding to escape arrest and transportation to the extermination camps.

Mazirel helped organise the 1943 bombing of the Amsterdam civil registry office. However, she did not participate in the attack itself because she was too short to convincingly pose as a policeman. She visited one of her co-conspirators, the openly gay Willem Arondeus, in prison shortly before he was executed for his role in the assault. Arondeus asked her to "tell the world that gays are no less courageous than anyone else".

In 1943–1945, the Germans raided her law firm three times. During the second and third time, people hiding there were discovered and arrested. Mazirel played an active part in the rescue of Jewish children from the Hollandsche Schouwburg deportation centre, and managed to take some children off the transport trains at the station. She even jumped on trains at marshalling yard Rietland to free children from the transport trains.

In late 1944, Mazirel was arrested and incarcerated at the women's jail on Weteringschans in Amsterdam. After six weeks, however, she was released from prison because her file had got lost.

=== Post-war period ===
After the war, Mazirel became active as an attorney for the LGBT rights organisation COC, founded in 1946. She was one of the originators of the term homofiel (homophile) to replace homoseksueel (homosexual), in order to place more emphasis on love than on sexuality. She was named an honorary member of the COC at its 10-year anniversary. She spoke at a COC-organised conference in Frankfurt in 1957.

Mazirel also worked as an attorney for the Nederlandse Vereniging voor Sexuele Hervorming (NVSH, "Dutch Society for Sexual Reform"). She was a member of the Commissie Abortusvraagstuk, a commission established by the Dutch parliament in 1952 to address the issue of abortion. She also defended NVSH chair and physician Wim Storm when he was charged in 1952 after having carried out an abortion, and she was an active member of the Nederlandse Vereniging voor Vrouwenbelangen, Vrouwenarbeid en Gelijk Staatsburgerschap (Dutch Society for Women's Issues, Women's Labour and Equal Citizen's Rights).

Mazirel left the Labour Party in protest against the politionele acties, the Dutch military action against the Indonesian independence movement, and joined the Pacifist Socialist Party which was established in 1957.

On 16 November 1950, she entered a pro forma marriage with her second husband, film operator Robert Jean Hartog, with whom she had served in the resistance. They had a son, Henri. In 1955, she and her husband moved to the French countryside due to her worsening health, a consequence of the violence she had endured during her time in the resistance. From France, she fought against the 1968 Woonwagenwet legislation to regulate Romani, which she considered racist, and also opposed the 1971 census which she believed collected too much personal information. In 1973 her son Henri had a fatal accident. She died 6 months later in France.

== Remembrance ==
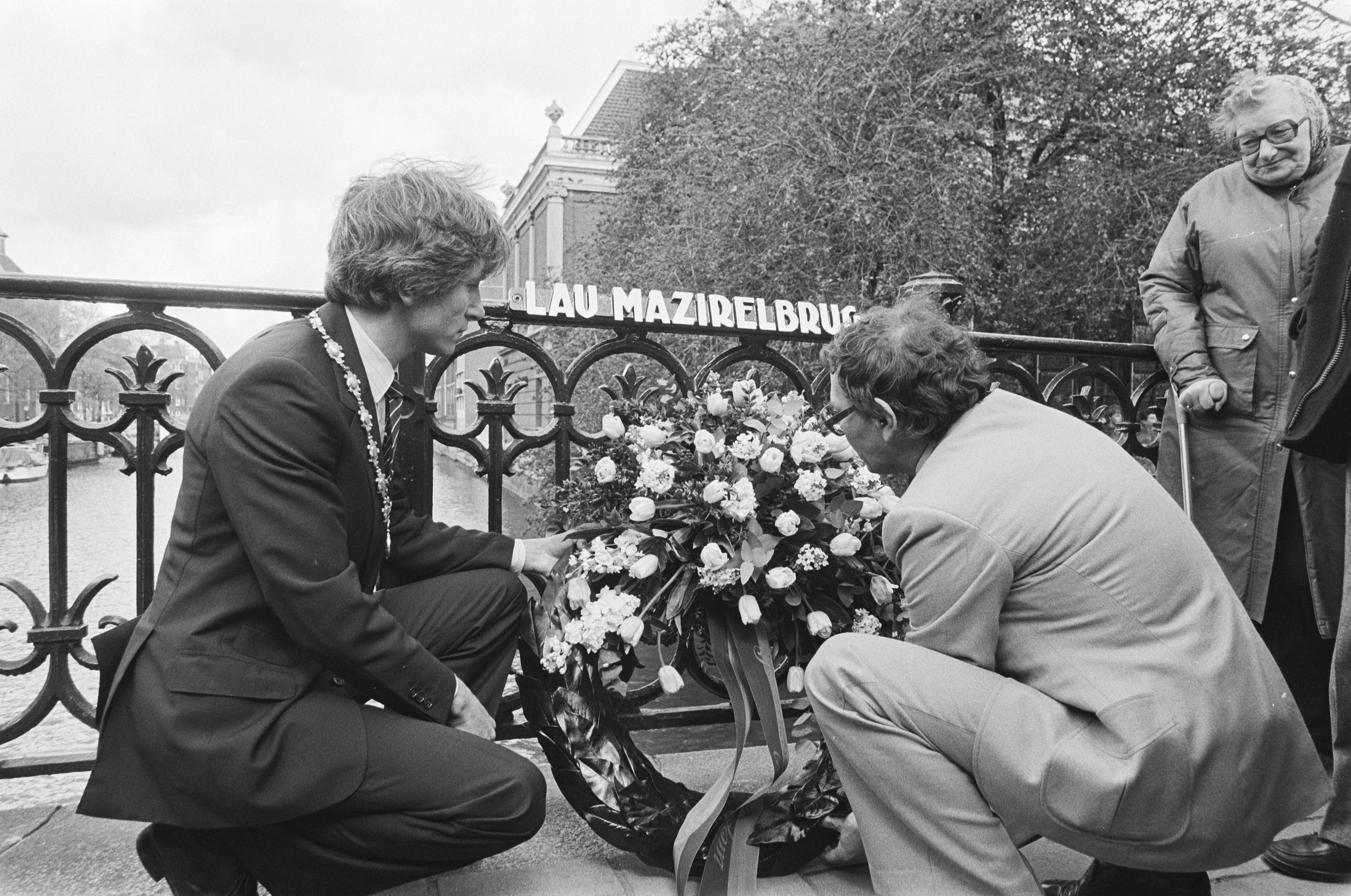
A ceremony in 1982 marking the naming of a bridge in Amsterdam in Mazirel's honour

Journalist Jan Rogier in 1981 founded the Lau Mazirel Stichting (changed to Vereniging Lau Mazirel in 1987), an organisation supporting the rights of Romani and other nomadically living people.

The Lau Mazirelbrug, a bridge across Plantage Muidergracht canal in Amsterdam, was named after her in 1982. A year later, a street in Amsterdam was also named after her, the Lau Mazirelstraat. The cities of The Hague, Leiden, Beverwijk and Spijkenisse also have streets named after her. During the annual Remembrance of the Dead on 4 May, a floral wreath is placed on the bridge.
