= Frieda Belinfante =

Dutch cellist and conductor (1904–1995)

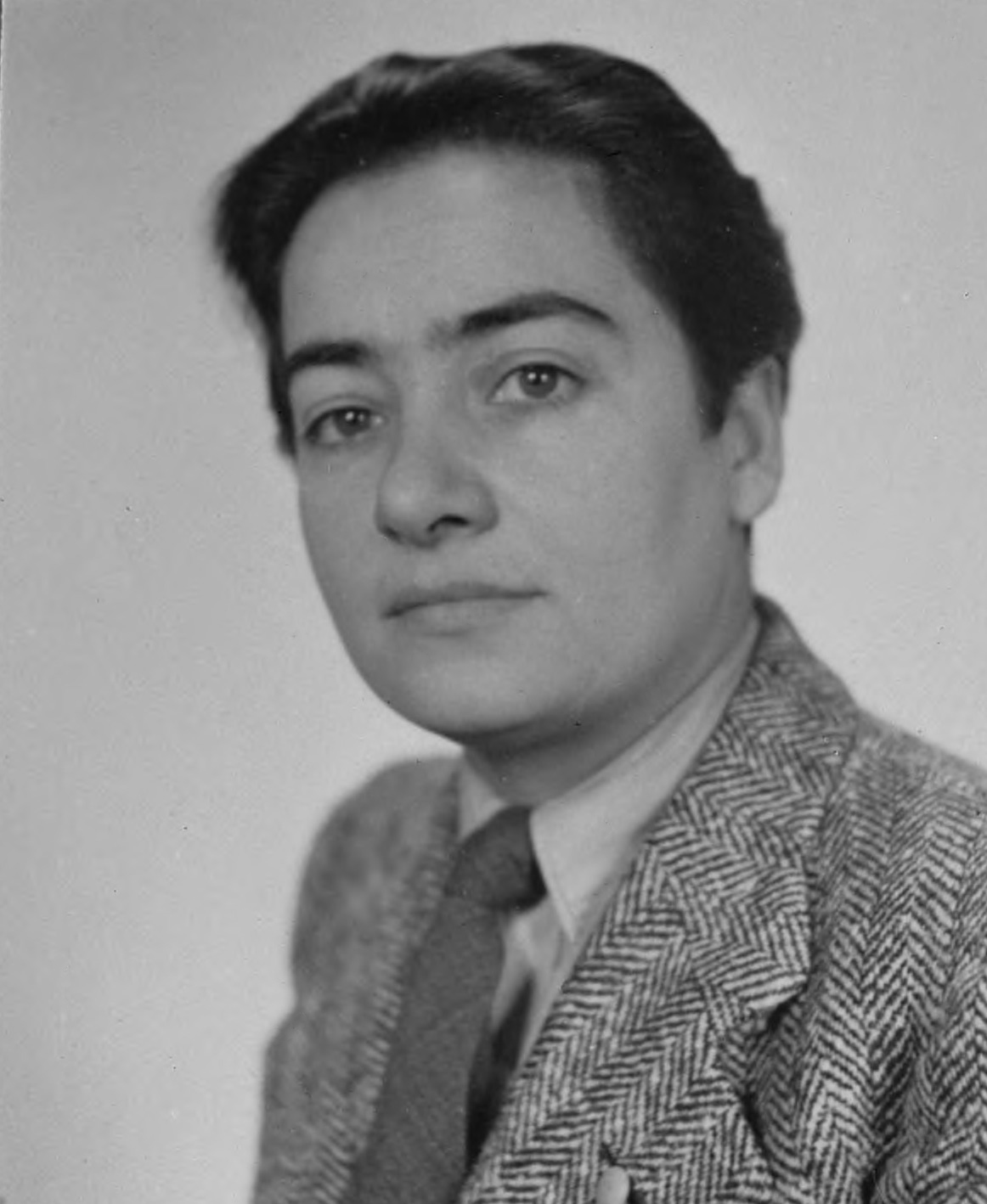
- A 1943 photo of Belinfante from the Nazi SD files on suspected resistance members

Background information
- Born: May 10, 1904; Amsterdam, Holland
- Died: March 5, 1995 (aged 90) Santa Fe, New Mexico, US
- Genre: Classical
- Occupation: Conductor
- Instruments: Cello and viol
- Years active: 1922–1962
- Formerly of: Orange County Philharmonic
- Partner: Henriëtte Bosmans
- Military career
- Allegiance: Dutch resistance
- Unit: Group 2000
- Known for: 1943 bombing of the Amsterdam civil registry office

Frieda Belinfante (May 10, 1904 – March 5, 1995) was a Dutch cellist and philharmonic conductor, a prominent lesbian, and a member of the Dutch resistance during World War II. After the war, Belinfante emigrated to the United States and continued her career in music. She was the founding artistic director and conductor of the Orange County Philharmonic.

== Early life and education ==
Belinfante was born 1904 in Amsterdam, the third of four children of Aron Belinfante and Georgine Antoinette Hesse. Her father was a prominent pianist and director of a music school in Amsterdam. According to Belinfante, her father was Jewish and her mother was Christian but her upbringing was secular. Belinfante attended the local public school until the seventh grade. At the insistence of her father that each child play a musical instrument, Belinfante began to study cello at the age of 10. She graduated from the Amsterdam Conservatory.

== Career ==
Belinfante made her professional debut in the Kleine Zaal recital hall of the Concertgebouw at age 17, assisted at the piano by her father. Her father died a few months after. Following her debut, Belinfante studied intermittently with cellist Gérard Hekking in Paris, with whom she developed a close friendship.

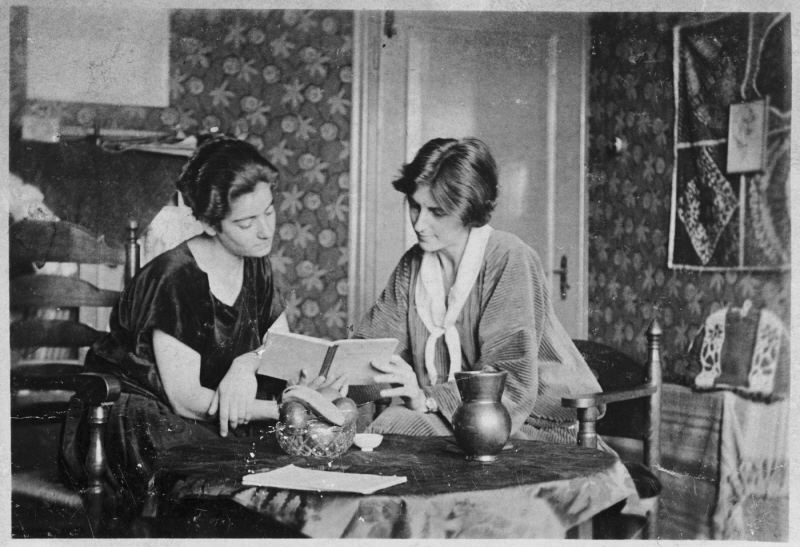
Frieda Belinfante, left, and Henriëtte Bosmans

After directing high school, college and professional chamber ensembles for several years, Belinfante was invited by the management of the Concertgebouw to form Het Klein Orkest in 1937, a chamber orchestra for which she was to be artistic director and conductor. Belinfante held this position until 1941, and it made her the first woman in Europe to be artistic director and conductor of an ongoing professional orchestral ensemble. Concurrently, Belinfante made weekly appearances as guest conductor on the Dutch National Radio, and appeared as guest conductor with orchestras in the Netherlands and in Northern Europe. In the summer of 1939, Belinfante attended the master class of Dr. Hermann Scherchen in Neuchâtel, Switzerland, to perfect her conducting skills. In recognition of her abilities, Scherchen awarded her first prize over 12 professional male conductors also enrolled in that class; the prize also included a debut engagement with the Orchestre de la Suisse Romande in Montreux.

The Nazi occupation interrupted Belinfante's musical career, which she did not resume until after the Second World War.

== Wartime activities ==
Belinfante became a good friend of the artist Willem Arondeus, an openly gay man who was a leader of the Raad van Verzet (Resistance Council) in the Dutch resistance. She actively contributed to the resistance movement, mainly by forging personal documents for Jews and others wanted by the Gestapo. Together with Arondeus, she was part of the CKC resistance group that organised and executed the bombing of the population registry in Amsterdam on March 27, 1943, which destroyed thousands of files and hindered Nazi attempts to compare forged documents with documents in the registry.

The CKC group came under scrutiny by the Gestapo after the bombing, forcing Belifante and other members into hiding. While in hiding, Belinfante learned of the arrests and executions of the other CKC members, including Arondeus. Belinfante disguised herself as a man and lived with friends for 3 months before being traced by the Nazis. The resistance helped her avoid capture and cross the border to Belgium and France, where the French Underground helped her make her way to Switzerland. When she and her travel partner arrived at the border in the winter of 1944, they were forced to cross the Alps on foot to reach safety. Her former teacher Hermann Scherchen saved her from being sent back over the border by verifying that she was a Dutch citizen and his former pupil. On arriving in Montreux, she was given refugee status and worked for a short time as a farm laborer. Belinfante was repatriated to the Netherlands as soon as the war ended.

In 2023 the English actor and broadcaster Stephen Fry made a documentary about Belinfante and Arondeus's wartime resistance activity, notably the "all-night forgery parties fuelled by booze and amphetamines [that] saved thousands of Jews".

== Orange County Philharmonic ==
Belinfante emigrated to the United States in 1947, eventually settling in Laguna Beach, California, and joining the music faculty of UCLA in 1949. Desiring to continue her conducting activities, she formed an ad hoc group she named The Vine Street Players in 1953, an orchestral ensemble of colleagues from the local area universities as well as studio musicians from Hollywood.

The formation of the Vine Street Players proved fortuitous for Belinfante. A successful performance in the Redlands Bowl by the ensemble under Belinfante's direction prompted local civic and cultural leaders to invite Belinfante to form a permanent orchestral ensemble in Orange County. She subsequently became the founding artistic director and conductor of the inaugural Orange County Philharmonic Society, which incorporated as a tax-exempt nonprofit organization in 1954 and became the first such ensemble in Orange County. Belinfante continued to employ the musicians from The Vine Street Players in the new Philharmonic Society orchestra.

Concerts by the Orange County Philharmonic Orchestra were free to the public, funded entirely by donations from sponsors and memberships. The orchestral musicians agreed to donate their time for rehearsals free of charge with the permission of their union local stewards, while receiving a fee for the performances as Belinfante herself did. Belinfante insisted on this arrangement with sponsors, and that all concerts remain free of charge for all future attendees. The founding board of directors adopted Belinfante's suggestions as their business plan with the stated mission of maintaining a resident professional orchestra in the county.

Under Belinfante's direction, the orchestra grew into a "B"-class musical institution taking into account its budget, programming and geographical penetration in the ensuing years. Its activities usually included a 4- to 6-program season in all major concert venues throughout the region, as well as youth concerts, cultural development programs and chamber music recitals in the community with principals of the orchestra and Belinfante assisting in several capacities. Soloists who were engaged to appear with the orchestra during the inaugural period included Lili Kraus, Leonard Pennario, Marni Nixon, Dorothy Warenskjold, and Mischa Elman. Belinfante appeared as soloist with the orchestra in the 1958–59 season, performing the Haydn Cello Concerto in C-major, Hob. VIIb/1. Throughout this period, she also appeared in numerous recitals locally and as guest conductor in engagements with European orchestras.

Belinfante's involvement with the Orange County Philharmonic came to an abrupt end in 1962 when her contract was not renewed. Financial pressures had been mounting because the musicians' union wanted the players to be paid for rehearsals. Additionally, board members and supporters from the community felt a male conductor would raise the stature of the orchestra and increase revenue. In a 1994 interview, Belinfante said she believed that gossip about her sexual orientation was used to quell the objections to her removal. Belinfante left her position as artistic director and conductor, but she continued to direct the Symphonies for Youth program for two subsequent seasons. The orchestra was disbanded and board president Clifford Hakes announced in local newspapers that "The Orange County Philharmonic Society will continue to operate entirely independent of any artists and orchestras we may represent..." The organization became an impresario presenter starting with the 1962–63 season.

== Critical reception ==
Belinfante's recorded output was sparse and poorly maintained. None of the pre-war recorded radio performances survive, and only the very last recording of her American career is preserved in the archives. However, more than three decades of critical reviews exist internationally that document Belinfante's superlative musical gifts. Her conducting technique was noted for her command of period style, cohesive ensemble, clear and decisive baton technique, transparent ensemble textures, buoyant and propulsive rhythms, and conducting all performances without a score. As a soloist on the cello and viola da gamba, she was noted for her particular insight into the music of Johannes Brahms and Johann Sebastian Bach, especially the Suites for Unaccompanied Cello BWV 1007–1012. Belinfante's solo, concerto and chamber performances were characterized by a singular beauty of tone, faultless intonation and legato, complete technique, profound involvement with the music, and an expressive interpretation free of mannerism. Her repertoire spanned all periods and media including works from the Baroque to contemporary living composers of the period, especially those working in the Netherlands and France and in particular her close association with Dutch composer Henriëtte Bosmans.

== Later years ==
Belinfante continued her musical activities on a limited scale after her dismissal from the Orange County Philharmonic. Belinfante established a private studio in Laguna Beach that trained numerous musicians. She also joined the board of directors of the Laguna Beach Chamber Music Society, acting as booking agent and artistic advisor to that group for more than 20 years.

Belinfante summed up her career in a Los Angeles Times interview: "It was just too early for me. I should be born again. I could have done more, that's what saddens me. But I'm not an unhappy person. I look for the next thing to do. There's always something still to do."

In later years she earned recognition for her accomplishments. In 1987, the Orange County Board of Supervisors and the City of Laguna Beach both declared February 19 'Frieda Belinfante Day", honoring her contributions to musical culture in the region. Belinfante's life became the subject of the documentary "But I Was a Girl" (1998). Her story was also featured in an exhibition, funded by the Dutch government, about the persecution of gays and lesbians during the Second World War. In 1994, The United States Holocaust Memorial Museum officially recognized Belinfante's contribution to the Dutch Resistance in World War II.

Belinfante died in 1995 from cancer, aged 90, in Santa Fe, New Mexico.
