= Lila Zali =

American ballerina (1918–2003)

- Zali as the Black Swan, for the Ballet Pacifica
- Born: Elisaveta Borisova Zalipskaya; 22 July 1918; Tbilisi, Georgia
- Died: 4 January 2003 (aged 84); Laguna Beach, California, US
- Years active: 1938–1988

Lila Zali Levienne (July 22, 1918 – January 4, 2003) was an American ballerina and ballet director. She founded the Ballet Pacifica in Orange County, California, serving as its choreographer and artistic director from 1962 to 1988.

== Early life ==
Zali was born Elisaveta Borisova Zalipskaya in Tbilisi, Georgia, the daughter of an operatic tenor. In 1922, while a young child, Zali and her family emigrated from Russia to Washington, DC in the USA following the 1917 Russian Revolution. Her father had a contract to join the Metropolitan Opera, but contracted typhus on the way to America and died. Her mother, also an opera singer, supported Lila by teaching music, and Lila began to study ballet at age 7. When she was 11 she began with Theodore Bekefi formerly of the Imperial Russian Ballet. (NOTE: Previous versions have erroneously stated that she studied at the School of American Ballet). At age 13, she was paid to perform in a Russian nightclub. She appeared in what may be the first ever American presentation of the full-length Nutcracker as choreographed by Bekefi in 1935.

== Career ==
In 1936 Zali joined and eventually became a minor soloist for Mikhail Mordkin's ballet company (now the American Ballet Theatre). After Mordkin's company was taken over by Ballet Theatre in 1940, she left and formed a small company called "Le Petite Ballets Russes." She then danced for Colonel de Basil's Ballets Russes but left in 1941 when her mother refused permission for her to tour with the company in South America. During World War II, Zali formed another small performing group called The Three Debs, and went on a USO tour in several western states. During the summer of 1944, Zali performed regularly on the CBS television show Balleretta. She also appeared on the Colgate Comedy Hour. In 1945, she moved to Hollywood where she appeared in many films including Limelight, Anything Goes, Daddy Long Legs, The Glass Slipper, and Silk Stockings; and was the dance double for Leslie Caron in Gigi, Gaby and An American in Paris. Zali also continued stage performances, dancing prima ballerina for the Los Angeles City Ballet and Ballet Musicale, which she co-directed with Michel Panaieff.

== Teaching ==
After moving to Southern California, Zali became an instructor at the Los Angeles dance studios of Adolph Bolm, and then Michel Panaieff, where one of her students was young Cynthia Gregory. When she and her husband moved to Laguna Beach, CA in 1959 Lila opened a local dance studio called Lila Zali Ballet Center. Dozens of her students went on to professional dance careers in many prestigious companies. The studio was renamed Laguna Beach Ballet Studio in 1990, but Zali continued to teach there until her death at age 84.

== Ballet Pacifica ==
In 1962 Zali formed the Laguna Beach Civic Ballet (later renamed Ballet Pacifica). The company established two ongoing subscription series, performing throughout Southern California, and often presented 70-80 performances a year. The company became semi-professional in the mid-70s. She served, without salary, as its director, choreographer, costume and lighting designer, seamstress, and fundraiser. She brought in many guest choreographers to add to the company's growing repertoire. The company was a charter member of Regional Dance America/Pacific (formerly the National Association for Regional Ballet) and Zali served as its president 1994-1996. Additionally, she was active in the Laguna Beach Arts Commission, and became president of Laguna Beach Soroptimist International. She retired from her role as Artistic Director in 1988, though the company continued to professional status under new leadership, until it folded due to financial issues in 2006.

== Personal life ==
In 1945, Zali married the cellist, Nicholas "Kolia" Levienne. He had toured with Anna Pavlova, playing for her famous performances of The Dying Swan. Kolia later founded the Laguna Beach Chamber Music Society. Zali died of natural causes in Laguna Beach, California in 2003. She had no children. She is buried at Pacific View Memorial Park in Corona del Mar, CA.

== Filmography ==
Year	Title	Role	Notes
1951	An American in Paris	Ballet Dancer	Uncredited
1955	The Prodigal	Monkey	Uncredited, (final film role)
