= Laguna Beach Chamber Music Society =

The Laguna Beach Chamber Music Society is a non-profit organization that presents chamber music concerts in Laguna Beach, California and surrounding areas. The Society was founded in 1959 by cellist and Russian émigré Nicolas "Kolia" Levienne. Its first concerts were held in the Laguna Beach ballet studio of Lila Zali, Levienne's wife and former principal with the Original Ballet Russe and the Mordkin Ballet. Levienne was assisted by his brother Mischa, a violinist, in producing the initial concerts and also performing in them.

The Society incorporated in 1960 as a non-profit and moved the concert venue to the Artist's Theater in the Laguna Beach High School campus, which became its home for the next 30 years. A typical season during this period included as many as six concerts supported by subscriptions, single ticket sales and eventually, donations and grants. The Society presented major chamber artists of national and international repute including the Beaux Arts Trio, the Tokyo String Quartet, the Borodin Trio, the Guarneri, Juilliard, and Emerson Quartets, among others. On special occasions, the society presented solo artists in recital such as harpsichordist Ralph Kirkpatrick and pianist Walter Klien.

In 1991, the Society merged with the Orange County Philharmonic Society and expanded concert venues first to the Barclay Theater on the campus of UC Irvine, and then the Orange County Performing Arts Center in Santa Ana, California. The combined organizations also present a week-long chamber music festival in Laguna Beach annually.
