= Willem Arondeus =

Dutch painter, writer and member of the Dutch anti-Nazi resistance

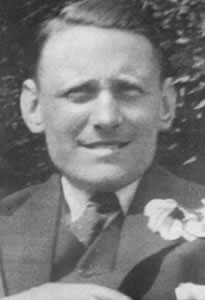
- Born: Willem Johan Cornelis Arondéus; 22 August 1894; Naarden, Netherlands
- Died: 1 July 1943 (aged 48); Haarlem, Netherlands
- Cause of death: Execution by firing squad
- Citizenship: Dutch
- Occupations: Artist, writer
- Known for: Member of the Dutch Resistance
- Notable work: Matthĳs Maris: de tragiek van den droom ('The Tragedy of the Dream')

Willem Johan Cornelis Arondéus (22 August 1894 – 1 July 1943) was a Dutch artist and author who joined the Dutch anti-Nazi resistance movement during World War II. He participated in the bombing of the Amsterdam public records office to hinder the Nazi German effort to identify Dutch Jews and others wanted by the Gestapo. Arondéus was caught and executed soon after his arrest. Yad Vashem recognized Arondéus as Righteous Among the Nations.

Arondéus was openly gay before the war and defiantly asserted his sexual orientation before his execution. His last words were: "Tell people that homosexuals are not cowards."

== Early life ==
Willem Johan Cornelis Arondéus was born in Naarden, as the youngest son of an Amsterdam fuel trader. His parents were Hendrik Cornelis Arondéus and Catharina Wilhelmina de Vries. He started working as an illustrator, designer of posters and tapestries and a painter. In 1923 he was commissioned to paint a large mural for Rotterdam City Hall. During that same period, he illustrated poems by J. H. Leopold, Pieter Cornelis Boutens and Martinus Nijhoff. He admired the older Dutch designer Richard Roland Holst, as can be seen in his work. He did not attain much fame and lived in impoverished circumstances.

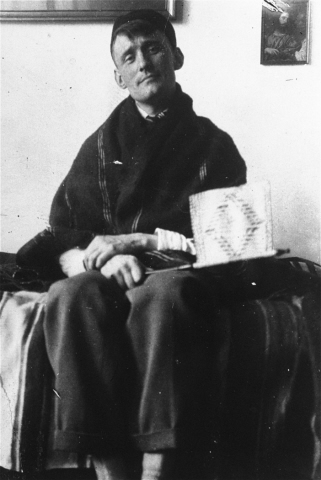
Arondéus on holiday on the island of Urk, 1921.

Around 1935, he gave up visual arts and became an author. The poems and stories he had written in the 1920s went unpublished, but in the year 1938 he published two novels, Het Uilenhuis ('The Owls House') and In de bloeiende Ramenas ('In the Blossoming Winter Radish'), both illustrated with designs by Arondéus himself. The year 1939 saw the publication of his Matthĳs Maris: de tragiek van den droom ('The Tragedy of the Dream'), a biography of the painter Matthijs Maris, who was a brother of the Dutch artists Jacob and Willem Maris. Two years later, Figuren en problemen der monumentale schilderkunst in Nederland ('Figures and Problems of Monumental Painting in the Netherlands') was published, again with designs by the author. At that date, however, Arondéus was already involved with the Dutch resistance movement.

== Resistance movement ==
In 1942, Arondéus started an underground periodical called the Brandarisbrief. In 1943, the Brandarisbrief merged with another publication called De Vrije Kunstenaar. Through the merger, Arondéus met Gerrit van der Veen, the editor of De Vrije Kunstenaar. In the resistance, van der Veen specialized in forging identity cards. As a result, Arondéus also became involved in creating forged documents, along with lesbian resistant Frieda Belinfante. A major detriment to the success of these forgeries was the Municipal Office for Population Registration as its existence made the forgeries less useful, since their legitimacy could be checked against the registration lists and determined to be fakes. Arondéus and van der Veen, along with a number of associates, developed a plan to destroy the registration office.

Their attack, which took place on 27 March 1943, was partially successful, and they managed to destroy 800,000 identity cards (15% of the records), and retrieve 600 blank cards and 50,000 guilders. The building was blown up and no one was caught on the night of the attack. However, due to an unknown betrayer, Arondéus was arrested on 1 April 1943. Arondéus refused to give up the rest of his team but his notebook was found, and as a result, a majority of the group were also arrested. Belinfante was the sole person from the group to have survived, forcing her to take on a man's identity and go undercover.

On 18 June 1943, Arondéus was tried and sentenced to death, along with 13 other men who participated. Two of the group received clemency, but the others were executed on 1 July 1943. Arondéus pleaded guilty and took the full blame, which may be why two young doctors were spared from execution and given custodial sentences instead. Before his execution, Arondéus made a point of ensuring the public would be aware that he and two other men in the group, Bakker and Brouwer, were gay, asking either a friend or his lawyer (accounts vary) to "Tell people that homosexuals are not cowards." (In Dutch: "Zeg de mensen dat homoseksuelen niet per definitie zwakkelingen zijn.")

== Legacy ==
In 1945, after the liberation of the Netherlands, Arondéus's family was awarded a posthumous medal by the Dutch government in his honour. In 1984, he was awarded the Resistance Memorial Cross. On 19 June 1986, Yad Vashem recognized Arondéus as Righteous Among the Nations.

In 2023 the English actor and broadcaster Stephen Fry made a Channel 4 documentary about Arondéus and Belinfante's wartime resistance activity, Willem & Frieda.

== In popular culture ==
In National Geographic's biographical World War II drama miniseries A Small Light, Willem Arondéus is played by Sean Hart.

== Gallery ==
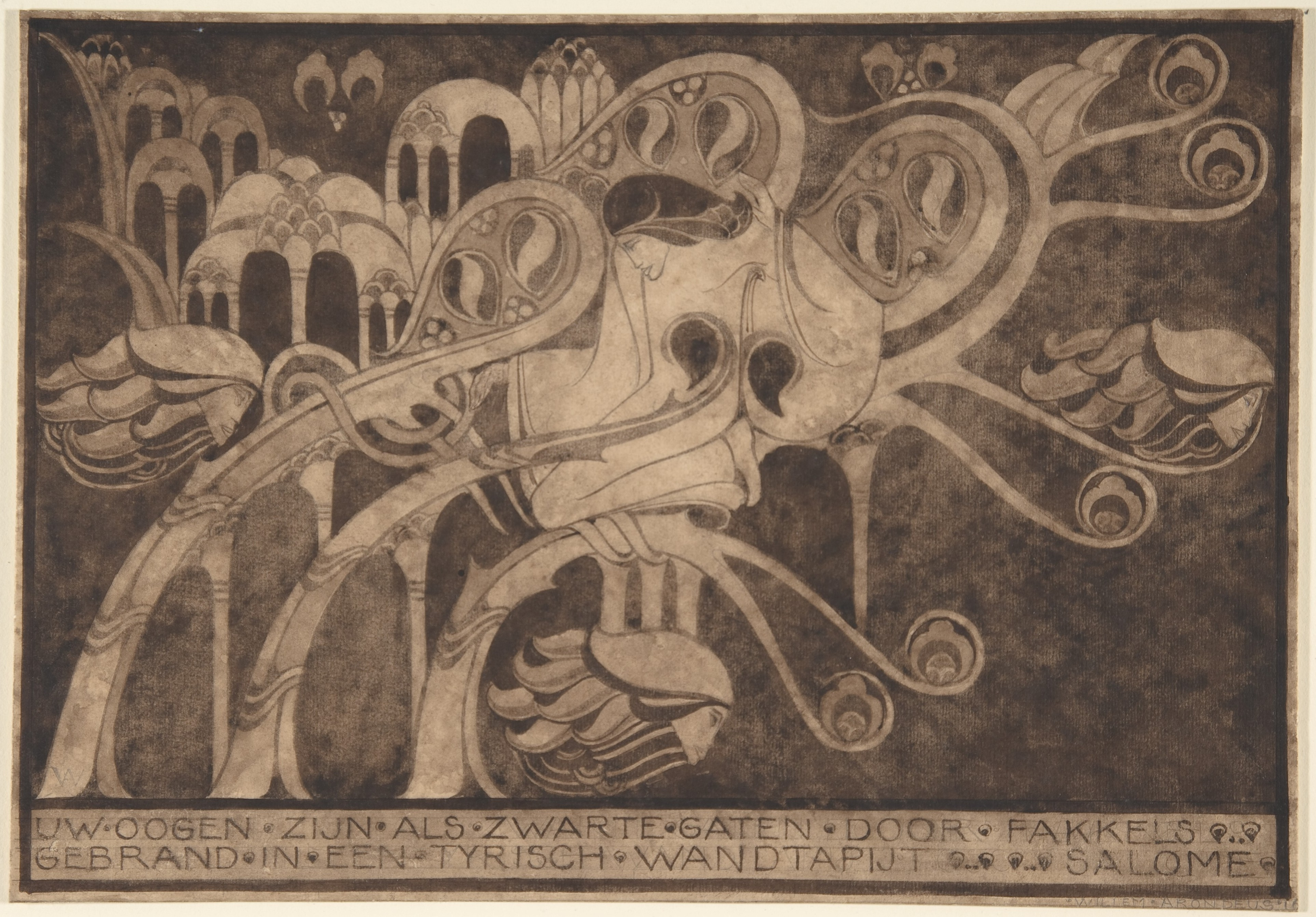
Salome, 1916

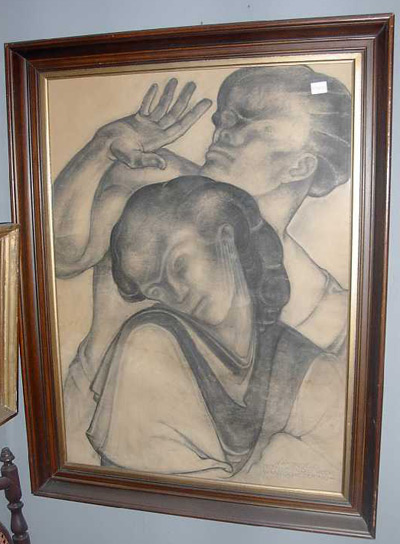
Pencil drawing

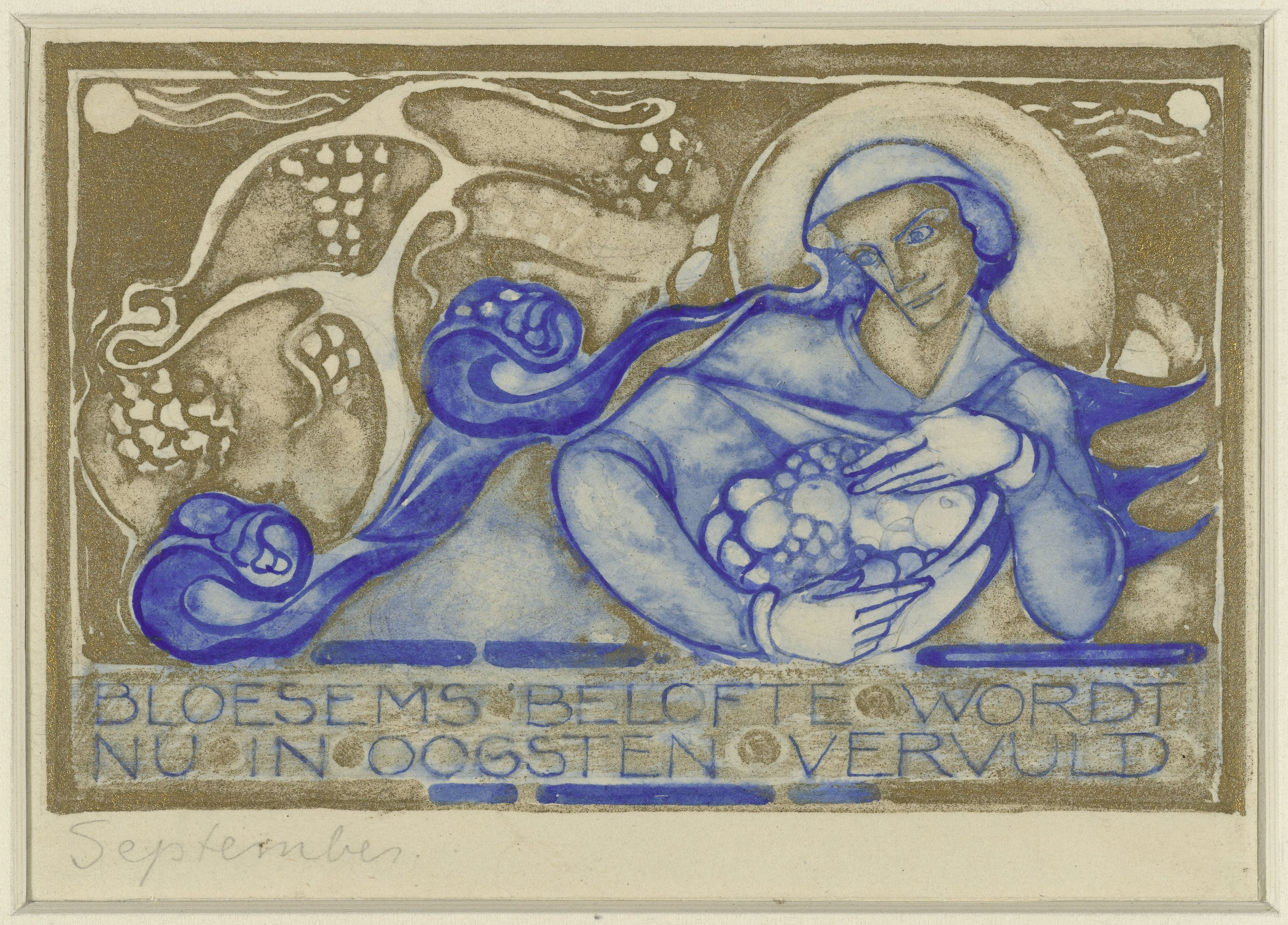
Calendar design for September, drawing, 1930–31

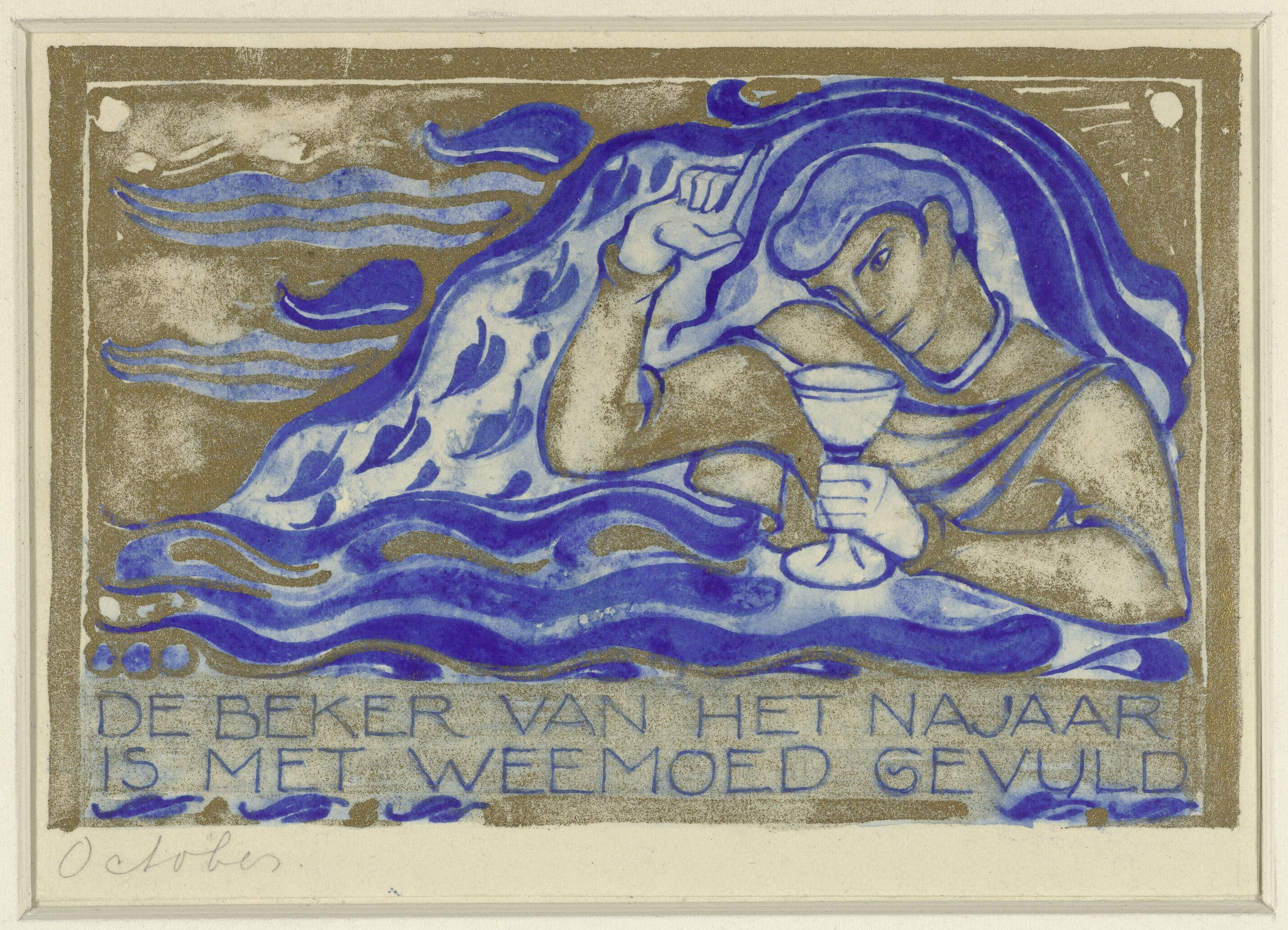
Calendar design for October, drawing, 1930–31

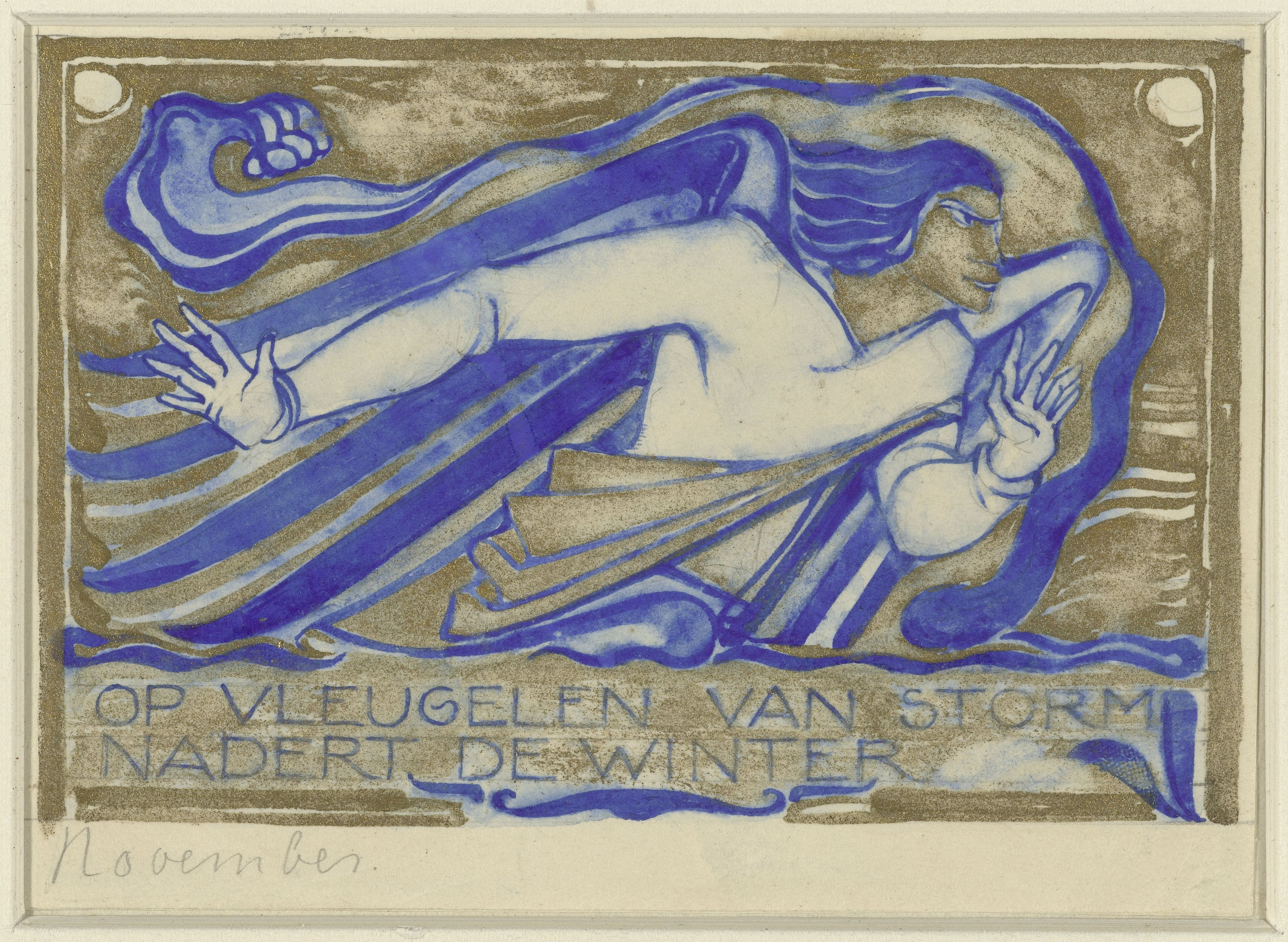
Calendar design for November, drawing, 1930–31

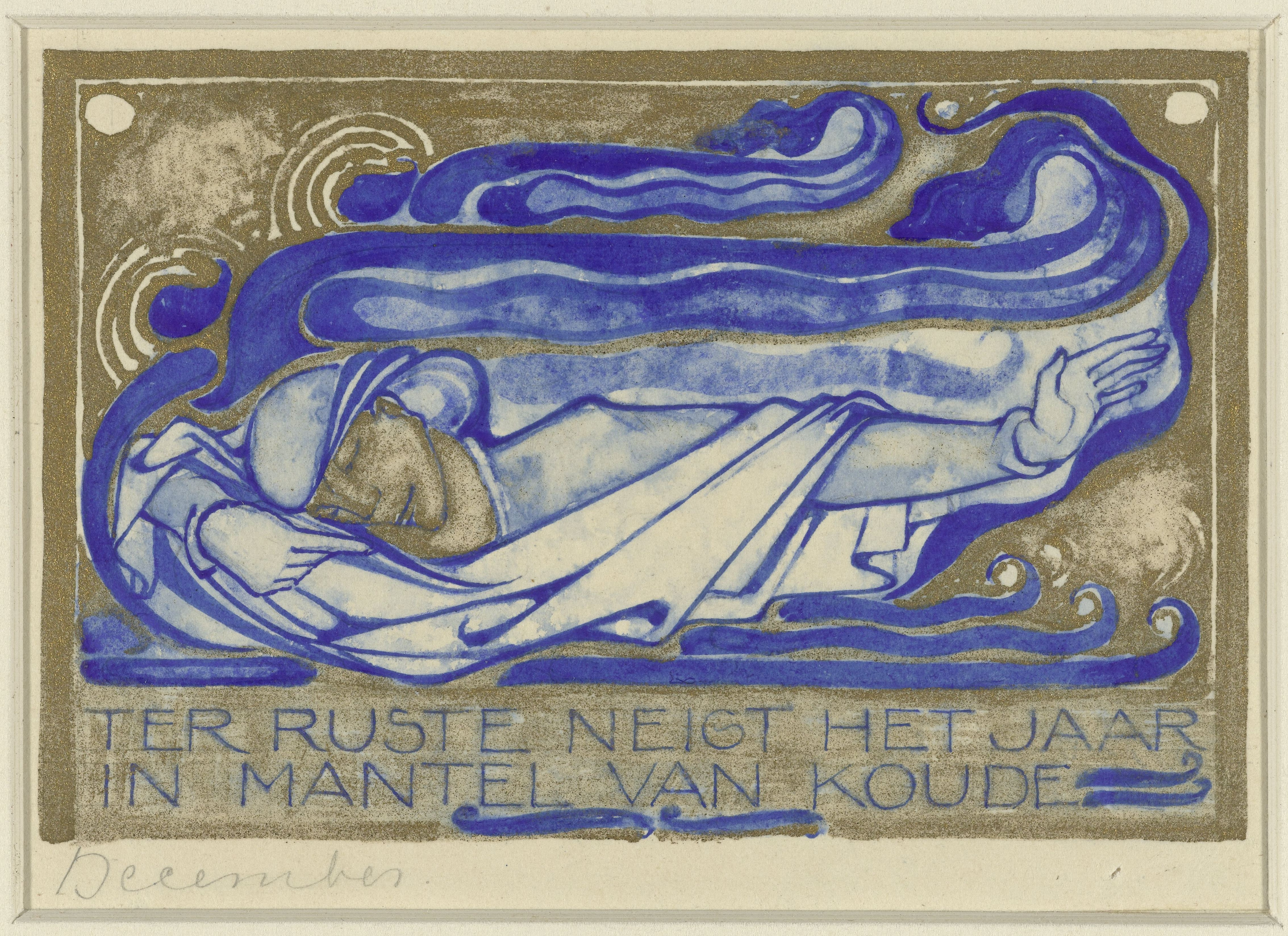
Calendar design for December, drawing, 1930–31

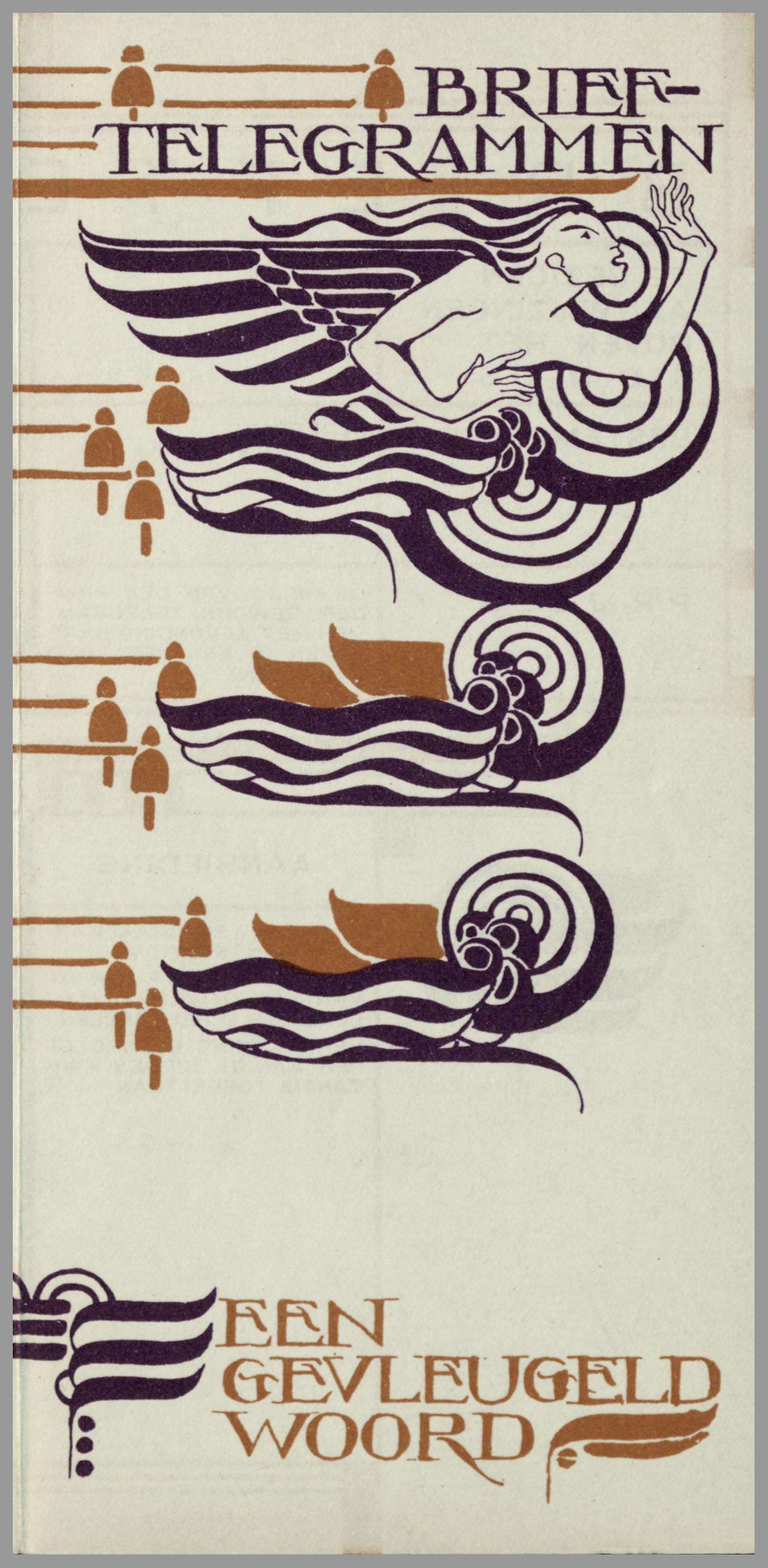
Brieftelegrammen, een gevleugeld woord, 1937–38

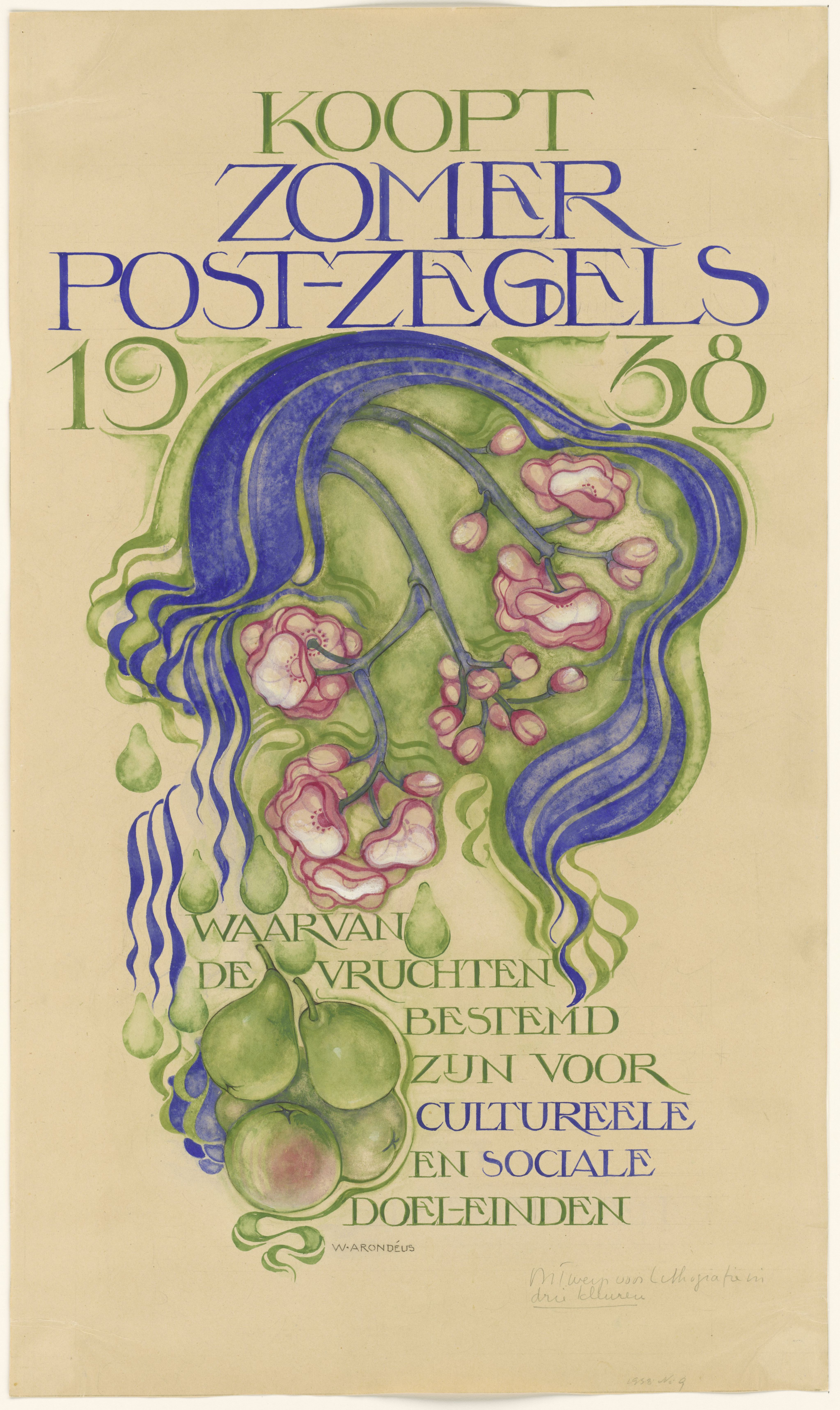
Design for a stamp, 1938

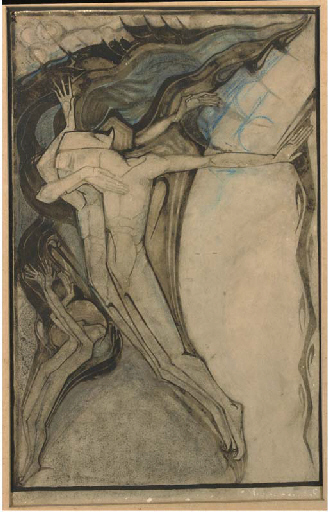
Purgatory, ink and chalk on paper, 1943

== Biographies ==
- Dantzig, Rudi van: Het leven van Willem Arondéus 1894–1943: een documentaire. Amsterdam, 2003.
- Entrop, Marco: Onbekwaam in het compromis. Willem Arondéus, kunstenaar en verzetsstrĳder. Amsterdam, 1993.
- O'Corra, Simon, Arondeus, A Play, Sachet Mixte Press, France, 2017 ISBN 9781974026104
- O'Corra, Simon, Perfidious, A Play, Sachet Mixte Press, Spain, 2019 ISBN 978-1693576027
