= Martinus Nijhoff =

Dutch poet and essayist (1894–1953)

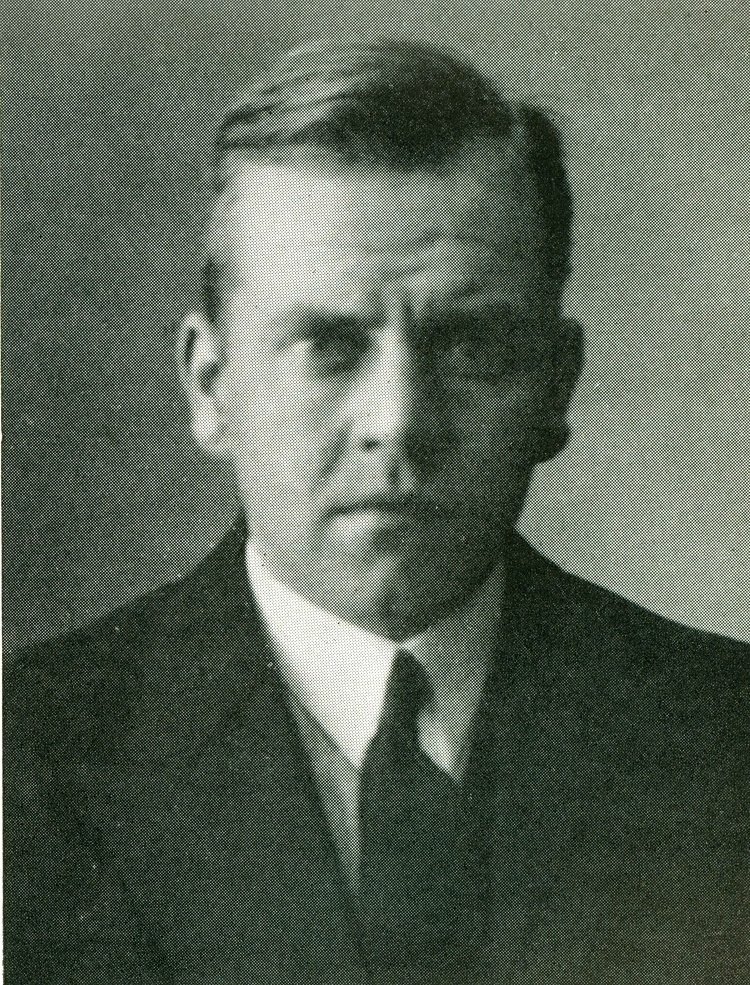
Martinus Nijhoff (1913)

Martinus Nijhoff (20 April 1894, in The Hague – 26 January 1953, in The Hague) was a Dutch poet and essayist. He studied literature in Amsterdam and law in Utrecht. His debut was in 1916 with his volume De wandelaar ('The Wanderer'). He then gradually expanded his reputation by his unique style of poetry: not experimental, like Paul van Ostaijen, yet distinguished by the clarity of his language combined with mystical content. He was a literary craftsman who employed skillfully various verse forms from different literary periods.

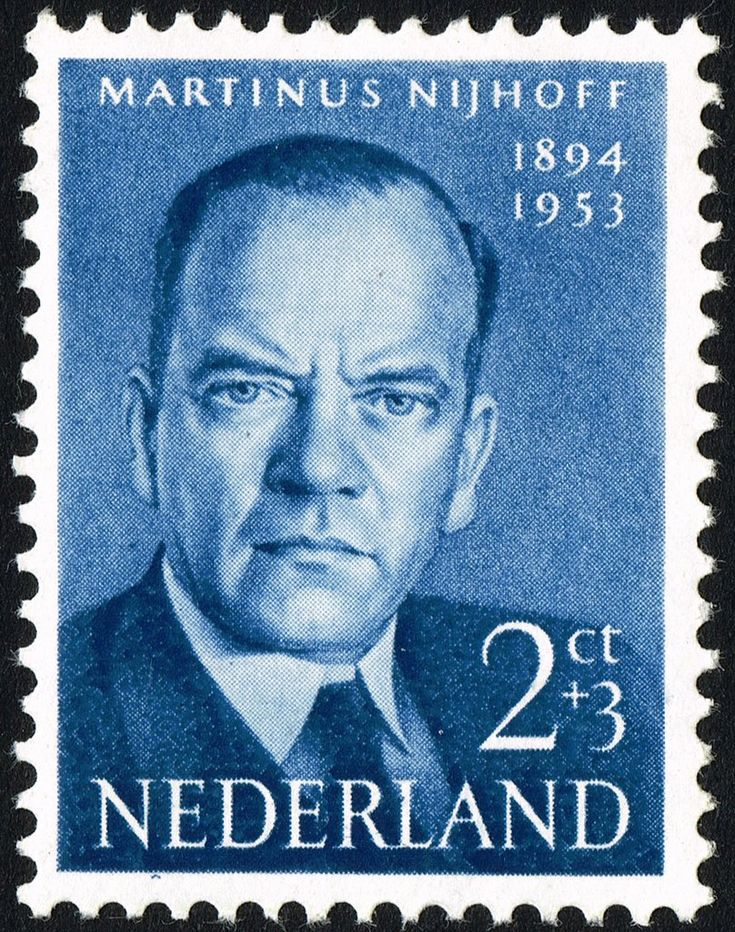
Dutch stamp (1954)

Some of his best-known works include Het Uur U ('The U Hour', 1936) and the long poem Awater (1934). A number of individual sonnets also rose to fame, particularly De Moeder de Vrouw ('The Mother the Woman') commemorating the opening of a bridge over the river Waal near Zaltbommel. Joseph Brodsky considered the poem Awater one of the grandest poems of the 20th century.

Nijhoff was awarded Constantijn Huygens Prize posthumously in 1953. In 1969, the new road bridge at Zaltbommel, that replaced the one in his poem, was named the "Martinus Nijhoff Bridge".

== See also ==
- Heer Halewijn
- Corpus Inscriptionum et Monumentorum Religionis Mithriacae
