= Gerrit van der Veen =

Dutch sculptor and resistance fighter (1902–1944)

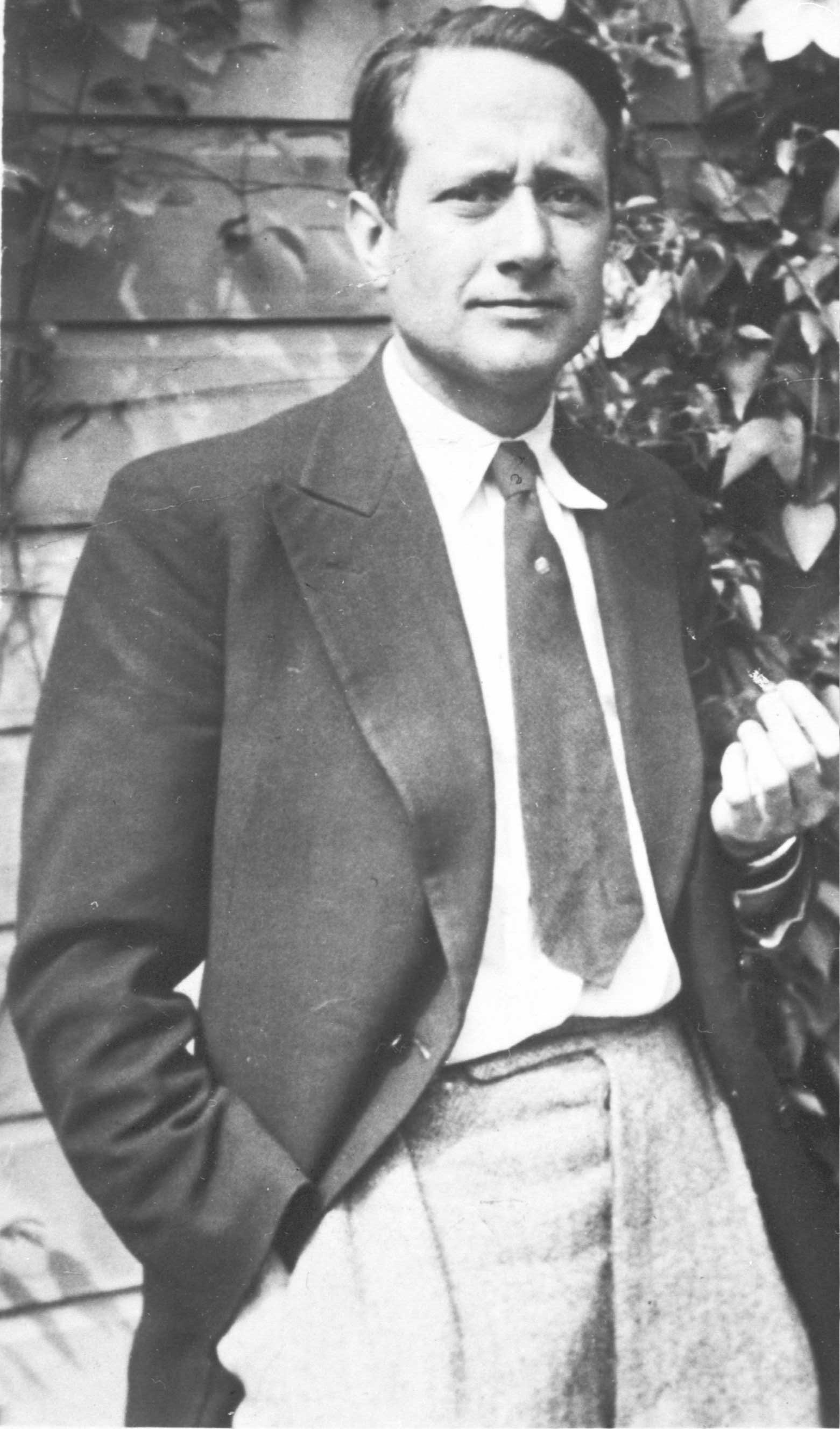
Gerrit van der Veen, 1940

Gerrit van der Veen (26 November 1902 – 10 June 1944) was a Dutch sculptor. He was a member of the Dutch underground, which resisted the German occupation of Amsterdam during World War II. The historian Robert-Jan van Pelt wrote:

In 1940, after the German occupation, van der Veen was one of the few who refused to sign the so-called “Arierverklaring,” the Declaration of Aryan Ancestry. In the years that followed, he tried to help Jews both in practical and symbolic ways. Together with the musician Jan van Gilse and the (openly homosexual) artist, art historian, and critic Willem Arondeus, van der Veen established the underground organization De Vrije Kunstenaar (The Free Artist). Van der Veen and the other artists published a newsletter calling for resistance against the occupation. When the Germans introduced identity documents (Persoonsbewijzen) that distinguished between Jews and non-Jews, van der Veen, Arondeus and the printer Frans Duwaer produced some 80,000 false identity papers.

He was arrested on 12 May 1944, together with publisher Tine van Klooster and his lover, dancer Suzy van Hall. He was executed near Overveen.

In 1945 his remains were reburied at Erebegraafplaats Bloemendaal. On 9 March 2002, van der Veen was made Righteous Among the Nations by Yad Vashem.

Also, in 1945, Amsterdam's Euterpestraat was renamed Gerrit van der Veenstraat in honour of van der Veen's activities with the Dutch Resistance during the war. In May 1946, he was awarded the Dutch Cross of Resistance, one of 95 people to receive that honour between 1946 and 1952.

== Gallery ==
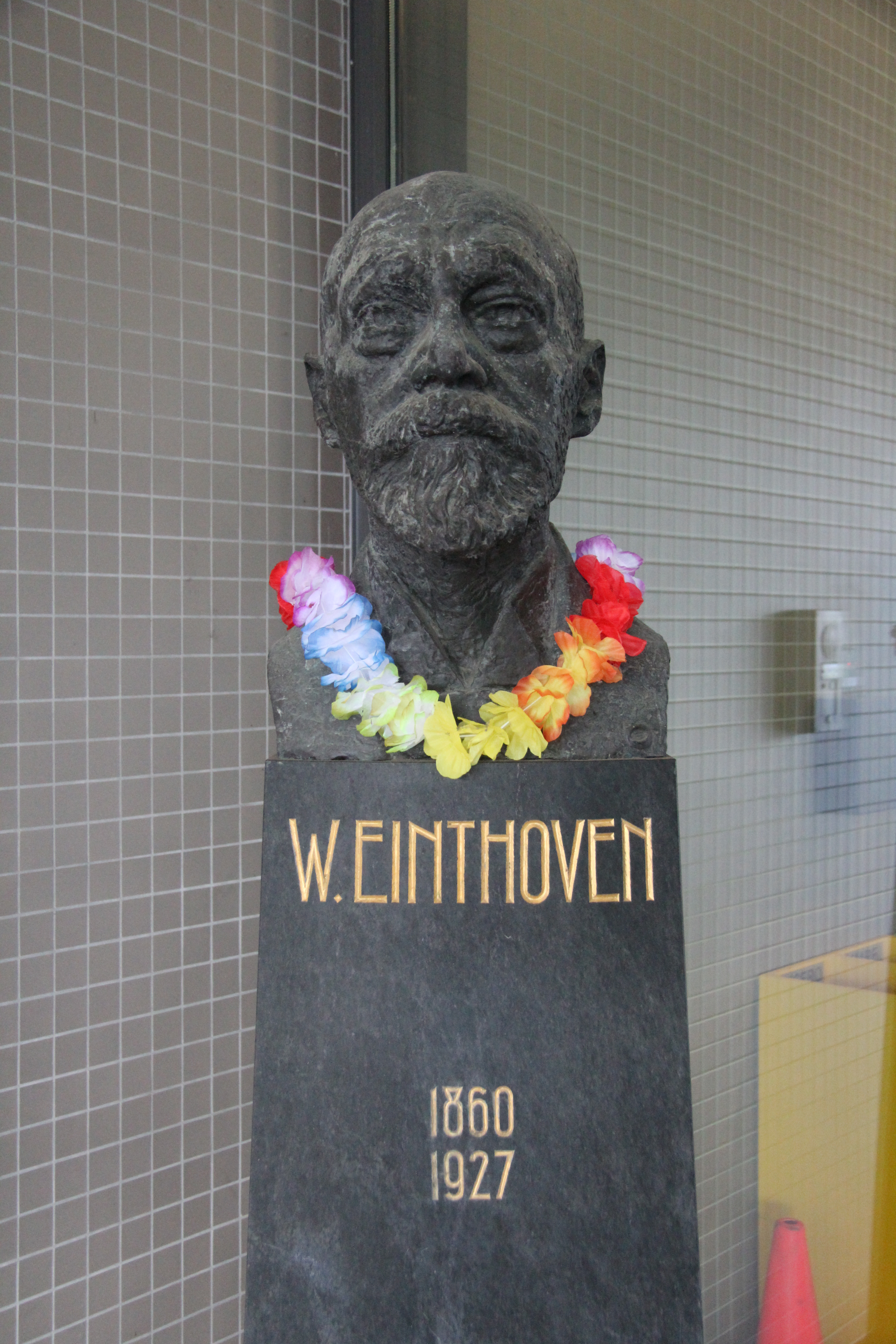
Bust of Willem Einthoven (1933)

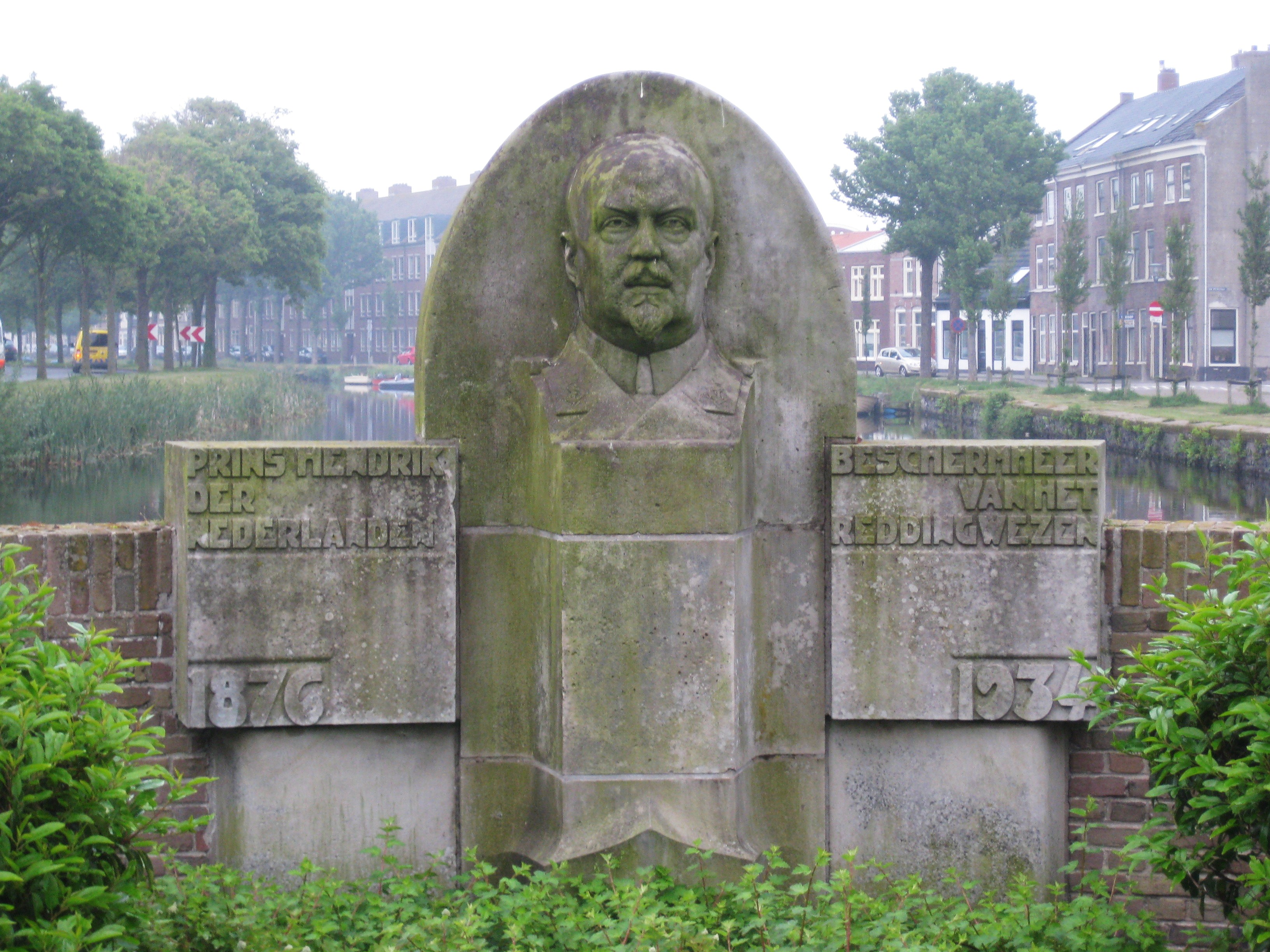
Monument to Duke Henry of Mecklenburg-Schwerin (Prince consort Hendrik of the Netherlands, 1935)

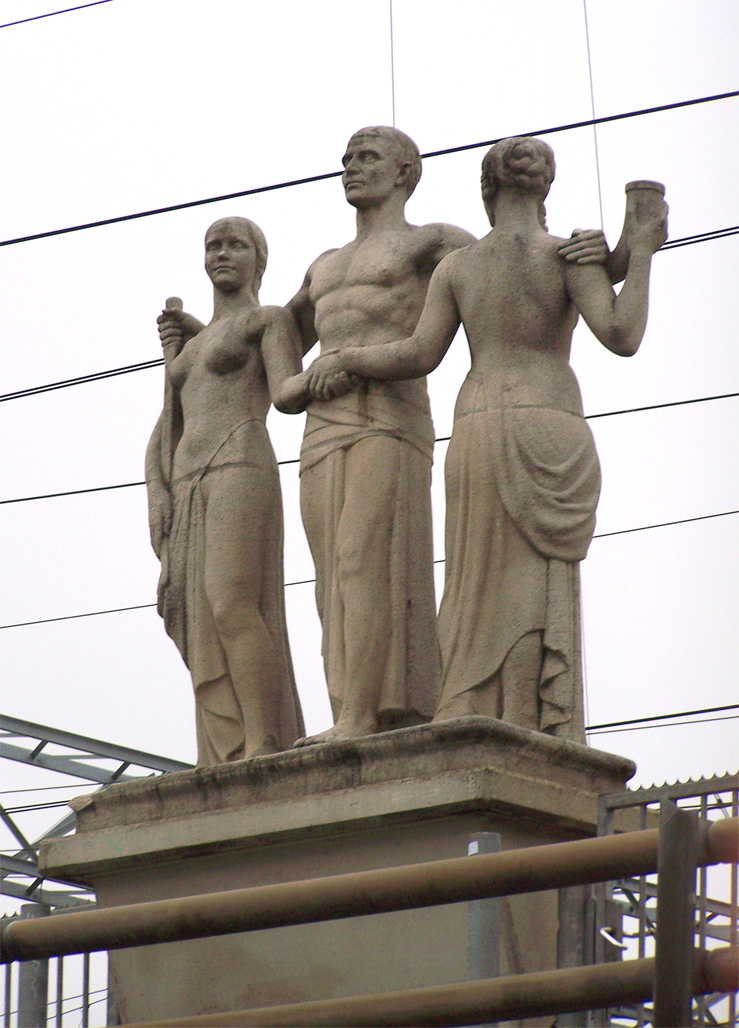
Van der Veen's last sculpture, "Unity of the Country" (1940), now in Utrecht

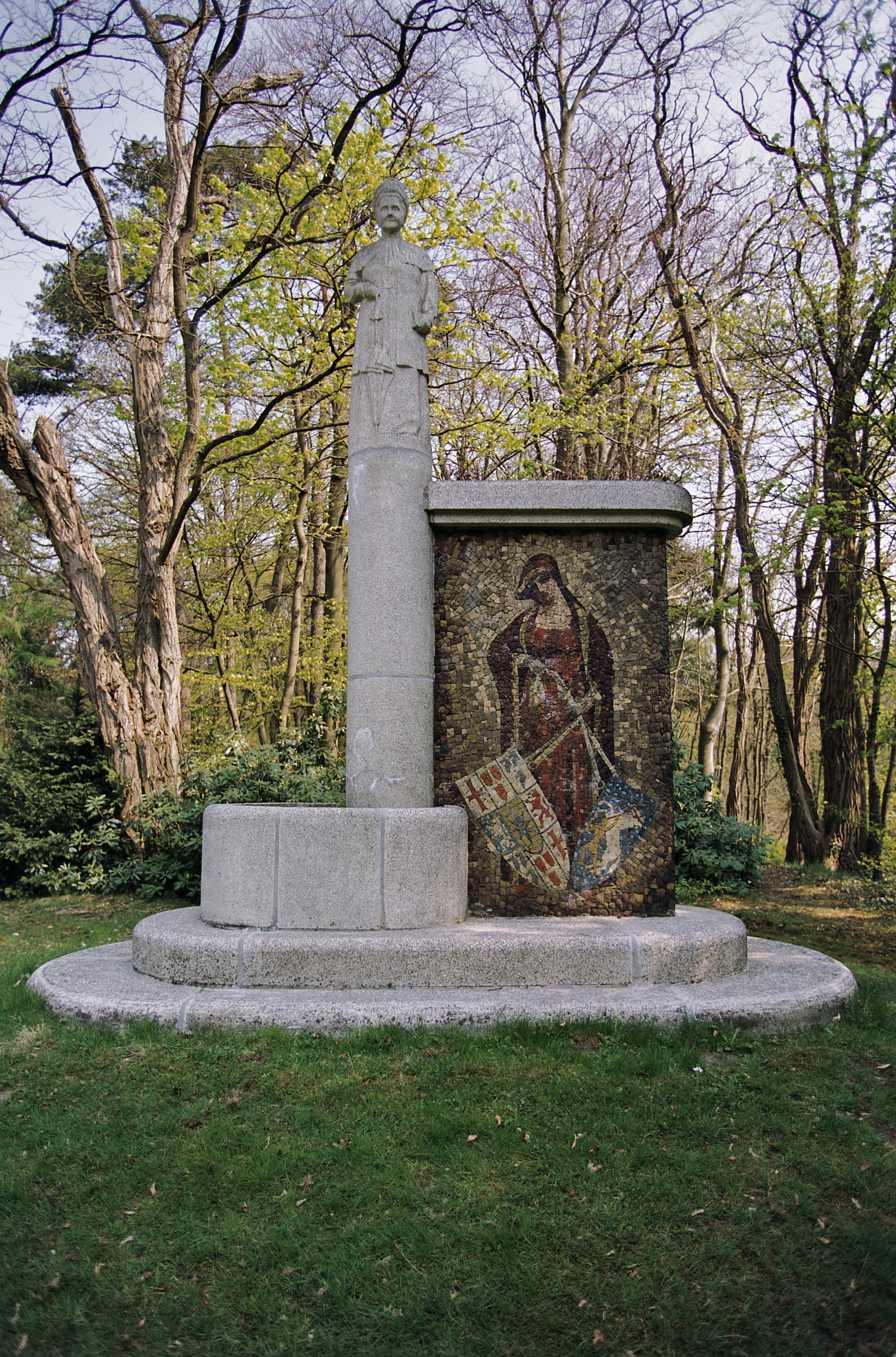
Monument to Queen Emma in Baarn
