= Hans Hoets =

Dutch resistance fighter in World War II

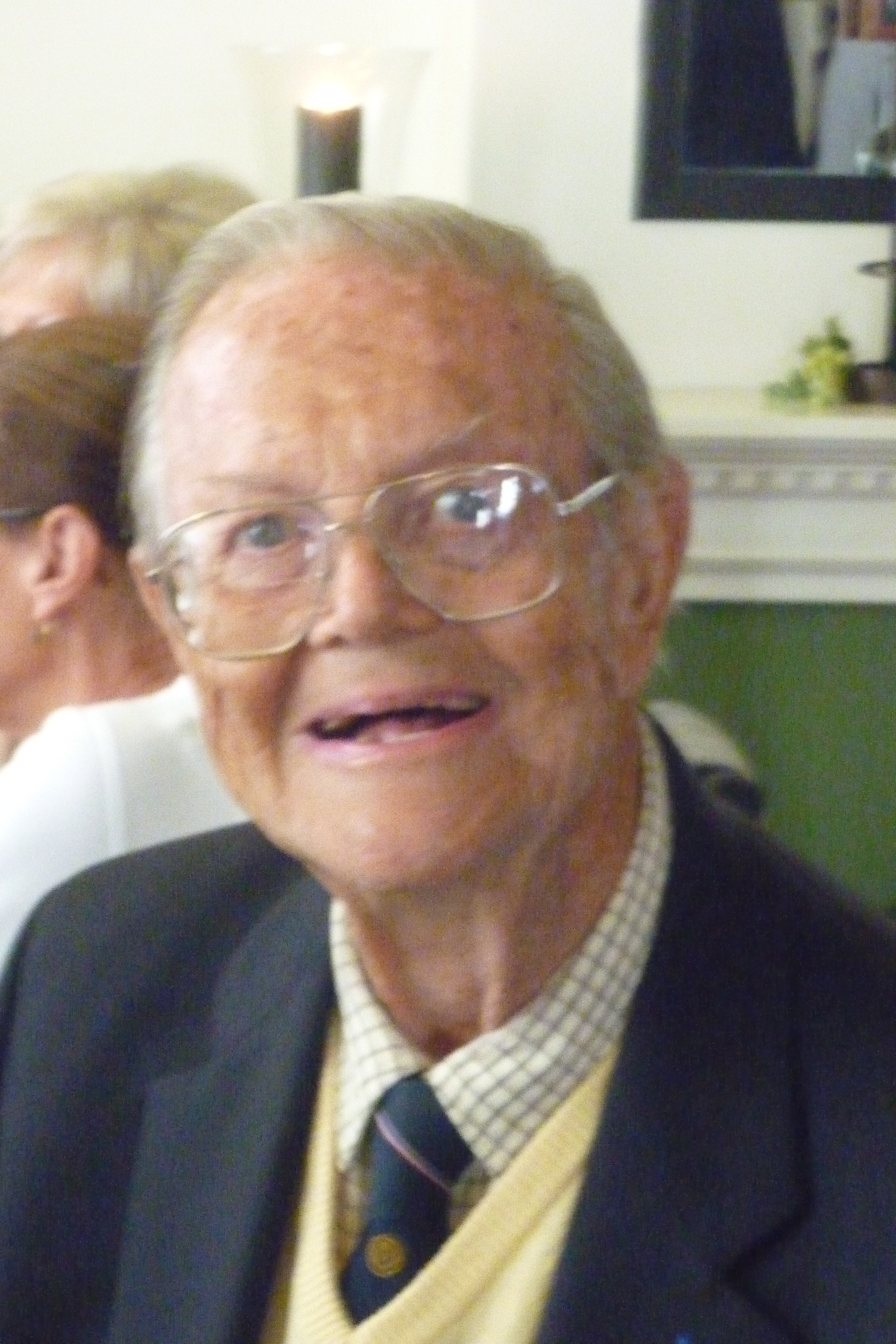
- Hans Hoets in 2011
- Born: April 24, 1921; The Hague, Netherlands
- Died: 28 August 28, 2014; Stamford, Connecticut, USA
- Military career
- Allegiance: Netherlands
- Branch: Royal Netherlands East Indies Army (KNIL)
- Rank: 2nd Lt. Special Services
- Unit: Infantry
- Conflicts: World War II
- Other work: Lawyer, writer

Pieter Johannes Hoets (April 24, 1921 – August 28, 2014) was a Dutch Engelandvaarder, an active Dutch resistance fighter against the Nazi occupation of the Netherlands in WW-II.

== World War II ==
After a failed attempt to sail to England on June 19, 1940, he eventually left the country from Delfzijl on October 13, 1944. In Stockholm he signed up as a volunteer and was assigned to the Dutch Intelligence in Stockholm to interrogate new arrivals. After he arrived in England, he served in the Royal Netherlands East Indies Army.

== Post-war ==
After the war he immigrated to the US, where he studied US law at Yale University, joined The Coca-Cola Company where he became Chief Counsel for Coca Cola Europe, and later joined New York-based Reid & Priest, a law firm with 160 attorneys founded in 1935 with an office in Washington, D.C.. Hoets authored five historic books, including De Yale Connection. De jacht op de Marcos-miljarden en het Zwitsers bankgeheim ("The Yale Connection. Hunting the Marcos billions and Swiss banking secrecy.")

== Death ==
Hoets died on August 28, 2014, in Stamford, Connecticut, the United States.

== Military and Knight's Orders ==
- Cross of Merit (Netherlands)
- Oorlogsherinneringskruis with four stars (War Memorial Cross)
- Verzetsherdenkingskruis (Resistance Memorial Cross)
- Officer in the Order of Orange-Nassau

== See also ==
- List of Engelandvaarders

== Bibliography ==
- Vrijgevaren! Met voorwoord van Erik Hazelhoff Roelfzema (1976), ISBN 9061001412
- Englandspiel ontmaskerd. Schijnstoot op Nederland en België 1942–1944 (1990), ISBN 9061003458
- Spookspoor naar Moskou (1996), ISBN 9024271452
- De Yale Connection. De jacht op de Marcos-miljarden en het Zwitsers bankgeheim. Met medewerking van Alexander Münninghoff (2000), ISBN 902611480X
- Buitengaats! Met een Engelandvaarder de wereld in (2006), ISBN 905911163X
