= Tedder certificate =

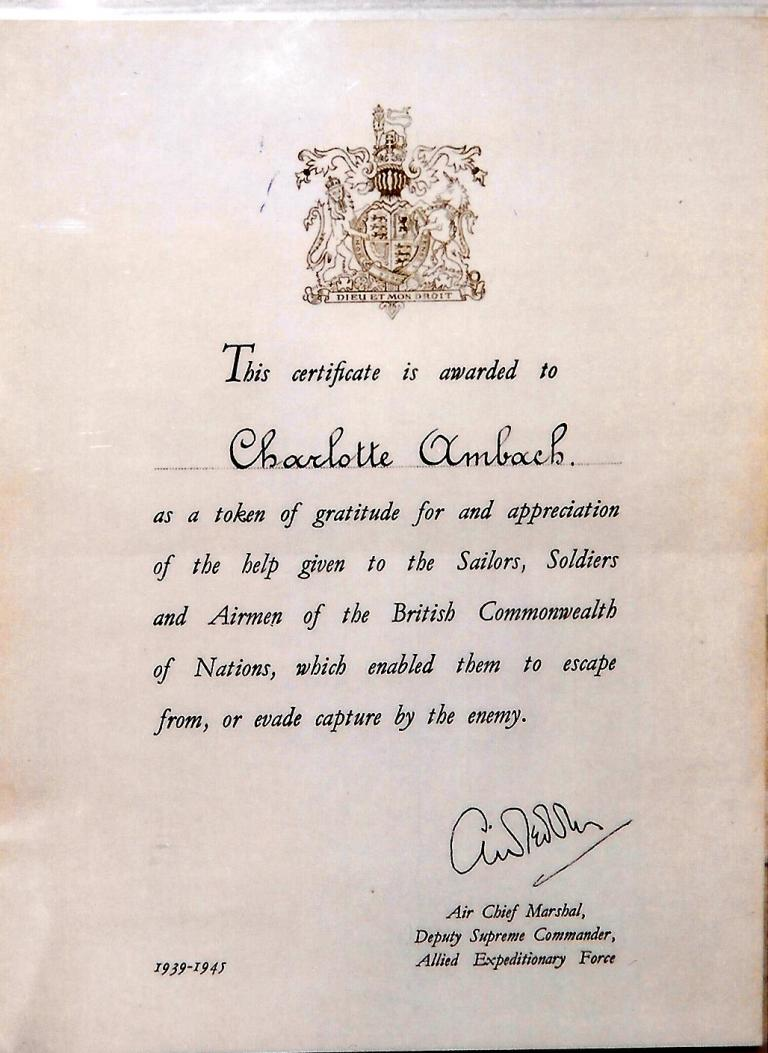
Tedder Certificate awarded to Charlotte Ambach

A Tedder certificate was awarded to citizens of foreign countries who assisted British service personnel to escape from German captivity in Western Europe during the Second World War. It was issued in the name of Deputy Supreme Allied Commander Air Chief Marshal Sir Arthur Tedder with individual awards vetted and sanctioned by MI9. More than 35,000 applications for the award were processed.

== Background ==
During the First World War the British Armed Forces awarded the Allied Subjects' Medal to Allied or neutral citizens who had rendered assistance to British personnel – often those who had escaped from behind enemy lines. During the Second World War the King's Medal for Courage in the Cause of Freedom and the King's Medal for Service in the Cause of Freedom were awarded for similar actions, including to many who had provided aid to British personnel evading Axis forces or escaping from captivity. The Tedder certificate was instituted as a lower level award for those who did not qualify for the medals.

== Award ==
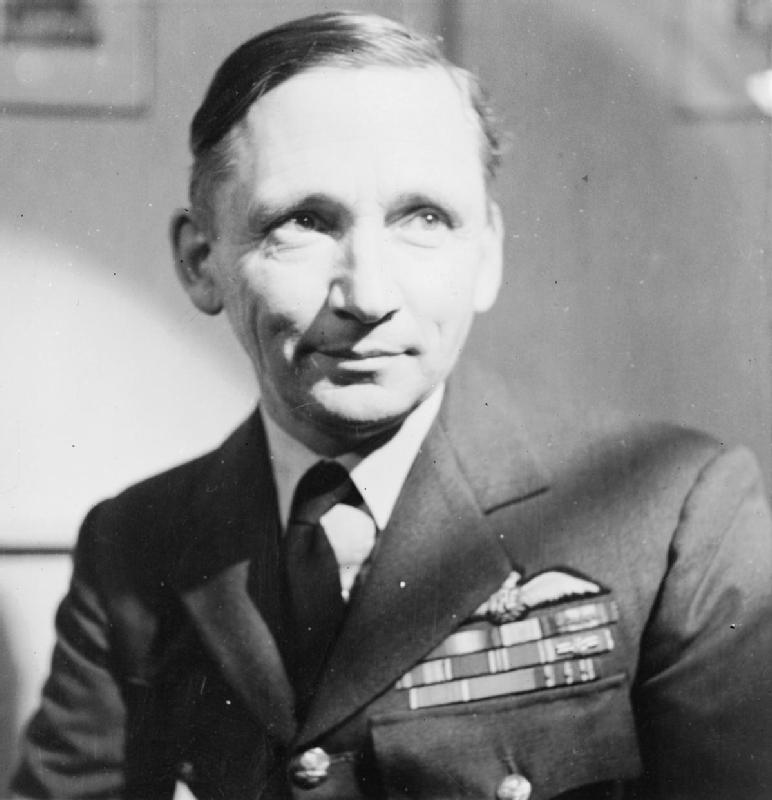
Air Chief Marshal Sir Arthur Tedder

A committee of the MI9 escape organisation was responsible for drawing up an initial list of potential recipients, vetting applicants and authorising the awards to deserving foreign citizens. The committee was headed by Donald Darling, who had headed the MI9 branch in Gibraltar during the war. Some recommendations came via the Royal Air Force's (RAF) Missing Research and Enquiry Service. This organisation worked from 1944 to 1952 to determine the fate of missing RAF personnel and to locate their graves across Europe. MI9 processed more than 35,000 claims from Western Europe in two years alone and also awarded compensation and expenses where applicable. Care was taken to weed out fraudulent claims, particularly from those who had collaborated with Axis occupiers and were now seeking recognition from the Allies as a means of avoiding persecution.

It had originally been intended that British Prime Minister Winston Churchill would sign each certificate individually. However, as airmen were in the majority of those who were helped, the RAF wanted the certificates issued in the name of one of their officers. Air Chief Marshal Sir Arthur Tedder was selected as he was also deputy supreme Allied commander. Tedder, however, chose to use a rubber stamp facsimile rather than signing each certificate individually. Similar certificates were produced for the other theatres of war: the Mediterranean version was signed by Field Marshal Harold Alexander and the Far East version by Admiral of the Fleet Lord Mountbatten.
