= Boekbinder =

Boekbinder is a Dutch surname meaning "bookbinder". Notable people with the surname include:

- Gerard Boekbinder (1909–1980), Dutch psychic working under the name Gerard Croiset
- Ina Boekbinder, (1915–1987), was a Jewish Dutch resistance fighter during World War II
- Kim Boekbinder, or Max Fractal Boekbinder, Canadian-born musician and filmmaker (also known as one half of the duo Vermillion Lies)
- Zoe Boekbinder, Canadian-born cabaret singer of Vermillion Lies duo

== See also ==
- Bookbinder (disambiguation)
- Buchbinder
