= Buchbinder =

Buchbinder is a German surname, which means 'bookbinder'. Notable people with the surname include:

- Bernhard Buchbinder (1849–1922), Austro-Hungarian actor, journalist and writer
- David Buchbinder (born 1947), American academic
- Chaim Buchbinder (born 1943), Israeli basketball player
- Leslie Buchbinder, American documentary filmmaker
- Natalie Buchbinder (born 1999), American ice hockey player
- Rachelle Buchbinder (born 1958), Australian rheumatologist and epidemiologist
- Rudolf Buchbinder (born 1946), Austrian classical pianist
- Susan Buchbinder (born 1959), American physician

== See also ==
- Bookbinder (disambiguation)
- Boekbinder
