= Aart Alblas =

Dutch naval officer

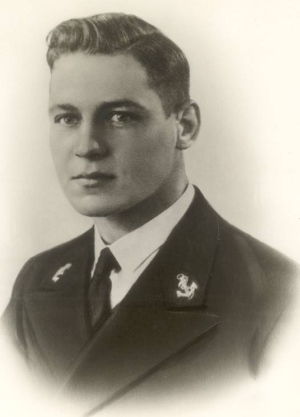
Aart Alblas in 1936

Aart Hendrik Alblas, aka Klaas de Waard (20 September 1918, in Middelharnis – 7 September 1944, in Mauthausen concentration camp), was a Dutch navy officer, resistance member and Engelandvaarder. He participated in several resistance operations and is one of the most highly decorated Dutch resistance members.

From 1940, Alblas collected information, often with John A. Idema. On the night of 18/19 March 1941, Alblas, with A.M. Westerhout, dressed in stolen German uniforms, travelled by motor boat to England to deliver the collection of information. For this exploit he received the Bronze Cross.

Alblas was eventually captured and subsequently executed at Mauthausen concentration camp on 7 September 1944.

== Awards and decorations ==
In recognition of his actions, he was posthumously made a Knight 4th class in the Military William Order. He also received the Bronze Lion, the War Commemorative Cross and the Resistance Commemorative Cross. One of the sixteen minesweepers, commissioned by Royal Netherlands Navy between 1960 and 1962, was named the KRM Aart H. Alblas in his honour.
