= Coosje Ayal =

West Papuan guerilla

- Born: 15 April 1926; Titawaai, Dutch East Indies
- Died: 28 March 2015 (aged 88); Ridderkerk, the Netherlands
- Occupation(s): Businesswoman, resistance member

Costavina Aya "Coosje" Ayal (15 April 1926 – 28 March 2015) was a resistance fighter in Western New Guinea during World War II. She gained fame as the sole female survivor of the only guerrilla group in the Dutch East Indies (present-day Indonesia) that held out during the Japanese occupation.

== Biography ==
Coosje Ayal was born in the village of Titawaai on the island of Nusa Laut in the Moluccas. When Ayal was six years old, she was adopted by her aunt Tina and uncle Seth Nahuway and moved to Manokwari, Western New Guinea. Because her uncle was a civil servant of the Dutch colonial government, she went to a Dutch school, where she learned the Dutch language.

During the Japanese invasion of the Dutch East Indies, Ayal's uncle was called upon by the Royal Netherlands East Indies Army (Dutch: Koninklijk Nederlands-Indisch Leger, KNIL) to hide weapons, food and ammunition in the jungle. When the Japanese fleet entered Dore Bay on 12 April 1942, an armed militia of 62 persons–of which sixteen-year-old Coosje Ayal was a member–was already hiding there, led by KNIL captain Johannes Bernardus Herman Willemsz Geeroms. The militia remained in the jungle for thirty months. Ayal wore a soldier's uniform and learned how to handle a carbine and hand grenades, but also performed 'domestic tasks' such as cooking, mending clothes and caring for the wounded. The 17 surviving members of the group under KNIL sergeant Mauritz Christiaan Kokkelink were relieved by the Allies on 4 October 1944. Coosje Ayal's aunt had been among those killed by the Japanese.

Ayal followed a nurse's training in Brisbane, Australia, as an infantrywoman in the Royal Netherlands East Indies Army Women's Corps and she was promoted to corporal. In Brisbane she also met the Dutch Caribbean soldier Henry Evers, whom she married in 1947. The family lived on Nusa Laut, in the Netherlands, and in the Netherlands Antilles. In 1964 they returned to the Netherlands, where Coosje Ayal first worked in a packaging factory and later founded her own catering company. From 1988 she received a Resistance pension.

Ayal always took part in the National Remembrance 15 August 1945 and has often been interviewed about her experiences as part of the resistance group in New Guinea that managed to avoid the Japanese occupiers. She died on 28 March 2015 and was buried with military honors on 3 April with a service at the Grote or Sint-Laurenskerk in Rotterdam.

== Honors ==
On 31 January 1946 Coosje Ayal received the Cross of Merit. In 1981, she received the Resistance Memorial Cross. In addition, Ayal received the Mobilisation War Cross, the Decoration for Order and Peace, the Wound Badge, and the Veteran's Badge.

On 17 March 2023 the Rembrandtweg in Ridderkerk was officially renamed to the Coosje Ayalstraat.

== See also ==
- Bep Stenger – another notable female resistance fighter in the Dutch East Indies during World War II
