= Kahlenberg (surname) =

Kahlenberg is German surname. Notable people with the surname include:

- Ingeborg Kahlenberg (1920–1996), Dutch photographer and resistance fighter
- Louis Kahlenberg (1870–1941), American chemist
- Richard Kahlenberg (born 1963), American writer
