= Bodo Sandberg =

Royal Netherlands Air Force personnel (1914–2005)

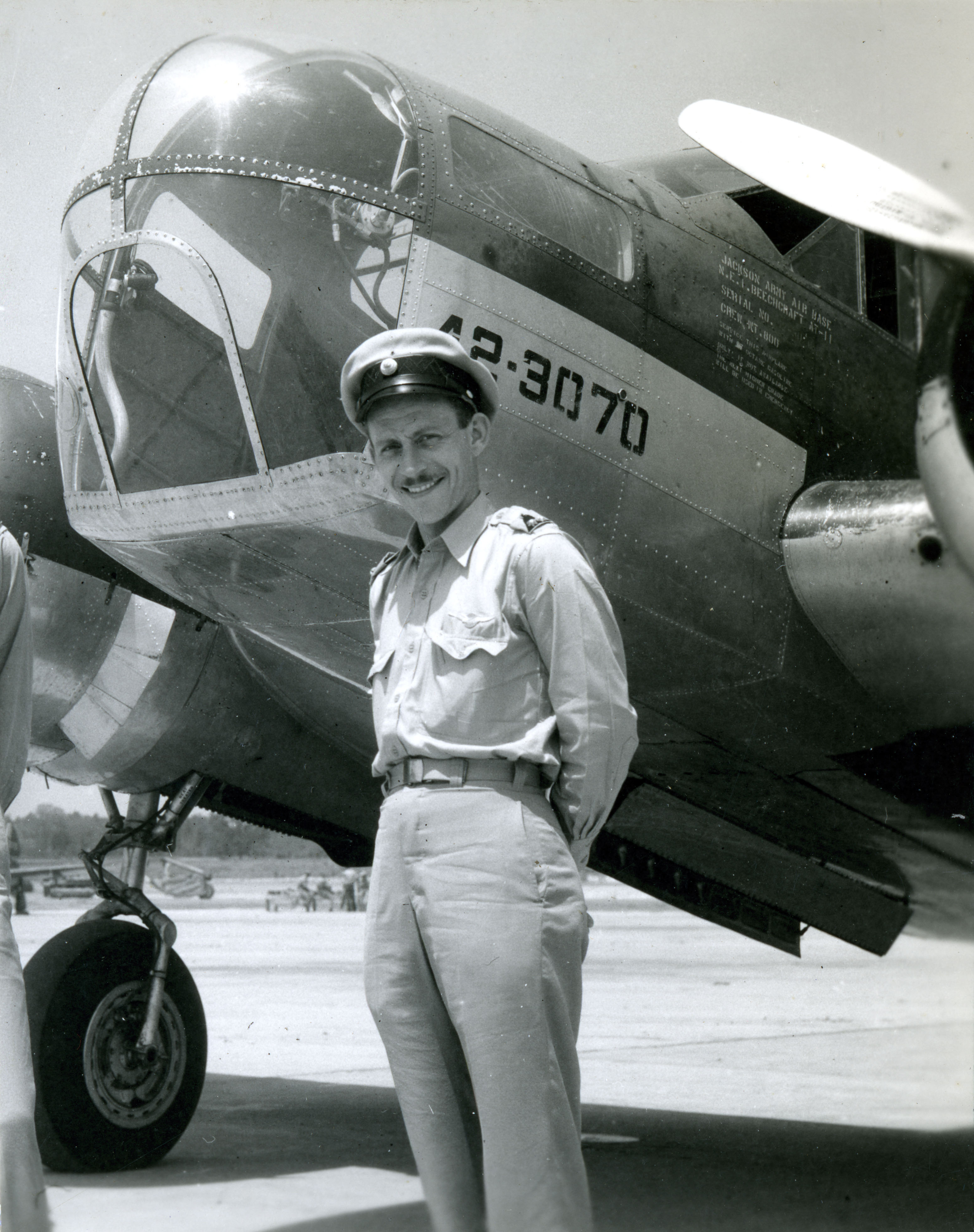
Sandberg at the Royal Netherlands Military Flying-School in Jackson, Mississippi, in 1943

Lt. Colonel Jhr. Bodo Sandberg (September 23, 1914 – May 2, 2005) was a fighter pilot in the Royal Netherlands Air Force and 'Engelandvaarder' during World War II. He was awarded the Cross of Merit and the Airman's Cross for his bravery during the German invasion of May 1940.

== Biography ==
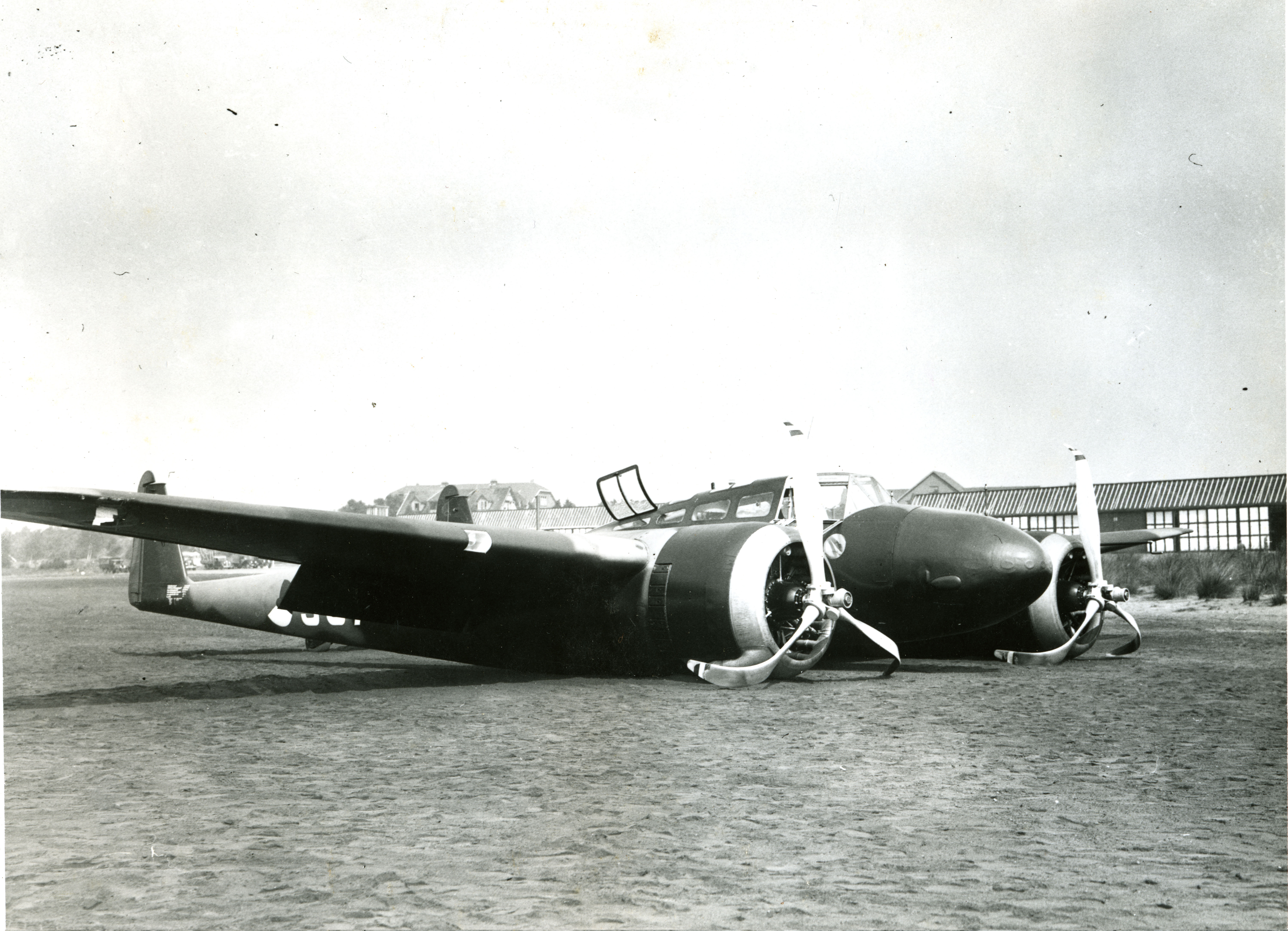
On August 26, 1939 Bodo Sandberg made the first successful belly landing in Dutch history

Bodo Sandberg was born in Rotterdam on September 23, 1914. From early childhood he wanted to fly so much that, at the age of 16, he built his own airplane. He had no money for an engine so he built himself a glider. When he finished it, a friendly pilot in an old bi-plane on a local airfield pulled him up in the air and he flew.

In those early days, if someone wanted to fly they had to join the Air Force. And so he did.

On August 26, 1939, Sandberg made history in Dutch aviation: he made the first successful belly landing.

On May 13, 1940, three days after the Germans had invaded the Netherlands, Sandberg was called into action. Because the Nazis had destroyed almost all the planes of the Dutch Air Force, Sandberg had to fly one of the few Fokker G-I fighters that were still airworthy. Along with one other G-1 fighter, he had to protect the last Dutch bomber, a Fokker T-5, against a deluge of German Messerschmitt aircraft. The small squadron's task was to bomb the Moerdijkbruggen (Moerdijk bridges), the Netherlands' largest bridges over the wide estuary of the Haringvliet, to hold back the German invasion. Just beyond Dordrecht, the squadron was attacked by nine Messerschmitt fighters, three of which attacked the T-5. The other six split up and attacked the two G-1s. The T5 went down in flames and crashed in the Grienden along the Noord, near Ridderkerk. The other G-1 was also shot down and crashed in a polder at Nieuw-Lekkerland. Pilot Sgt. Paul Schoute perished in the violently burning wreck. Hans Lindner was thrown out of the plane and ended up against the verge of a waterway with his leg shot off. His hair still burning. Someone rushed to help him, extinguished it with water from the canal, but he died shortly thereafter. Shot by the machine guns from the Messerschmits, Sandberg was bleeding from bullet holes in his leather pilot's jacket, but he found a cloud in which he escaped from the German attackers. He managed to keep his damaged plane in the air long enough to find a highway near the Hague where he could make an emergency landing. It was a close call but Sandberg and his crewman V. D. Breemer survived this mission. They were the only two.

== Escape to England and fighting on two fronts ==
Immediately after the German invasion Sandberg tried to escape from the Nazi-occupied Netherlands to reach England to continue his fight against the invaders.

His first attempt was with four others (Ch. A. den Hoed, G. Reels, E.A. Plate and J. Versteegh). On their way through Belgium, France and Spain to Portugal (from where they could fly to England), they made it as far as Poligny, just east of Paris, but there they were betrayed and arrested. They ended up in a German prisoner-of-war camp outside Lyon. However, they escaped by stealing the camp commander's car. They were starved and sick, but all five made it back to the Netherlands.

Sandberg did not give up and made a second attempt. This time he escaped from the Netherlands with three fellow fighter pilots from the Dutch Air Force, Jan Bosch, Faam Janssens and A. C. H. Kanters, and this time they made it to England.

From England Bodo was sent to the US where in 1944 he trained on American fighters (the Curtiss P-40 Warhawk) at the Royal Netherlands Military Flying-School in Jackson, Mississippi. After completing his training, he was sent to Australia and New Guinea in the South Pacific, where he fought against the Japanese.

As the Second World War was entering its final phase, Bodo Sandberg came home to the Netherlands from the US, Australia and New Guinea, albeit for a fleeting moment, as he was sent out into action again, this time to Dutch Indonesia, Singapore and Ceylon (now Malaysia). In February 1946 he flew from Batavia (now Jarakrta) via Singapore to Penang, where he worked with Peter Tazelaar, one of the Netherlands' most heroic resistance fighters and fellow "Engelandvaarder".

In 1947 Bodo was awarded the “Ereteken voor Orde en Vrede 1947” for his contributions to the Netherlands' efforts to re-establish peace and order in Dutch-Indonesia after the Japanese capitulation.

Jhr. Bodo Sandberg lived to be 90, dying on May 2, 2005, in Bentveld, Netherlands.

Sandberg was awarded the Cross of Merit and the Airman's Cross, both Knight’s Orders, by H.R.H. Wilhelmina, Queen of the Netherlands.

== After the war ==
After the war, Bodo stayed active in the Dutch Air Force as a fighter pilot and flight instructor. He commanded a squadron of Supermarine Spitfires at Dutch Air Force Base Soesterberg. After Sandberg was injured in a crash with a Spitfire at Soesterberg, he became Air Attaché for the four Nordic countries in the Dutch Embassy in Oslo, Norway. Sandberg completed his more than 30 year Air Force career as commander of Dutch Air Force Base Ypenburg.

== Private life ==
Sandberg married Catharina Elisabeth (Lies) Sandberg-Brugsma in Haarlem, the Netherlands, on November 23, 1939.

They had two sons, Jhr. Steven W.H. Sandberg (Haarlem, August 25, 1940 – Aerdenhout, March 18, 2016) and Jhr. Job B.B. Sandberg (Job Sandberg), Haarlem, March 23, 1946.

== Military and Knight's Orders ==
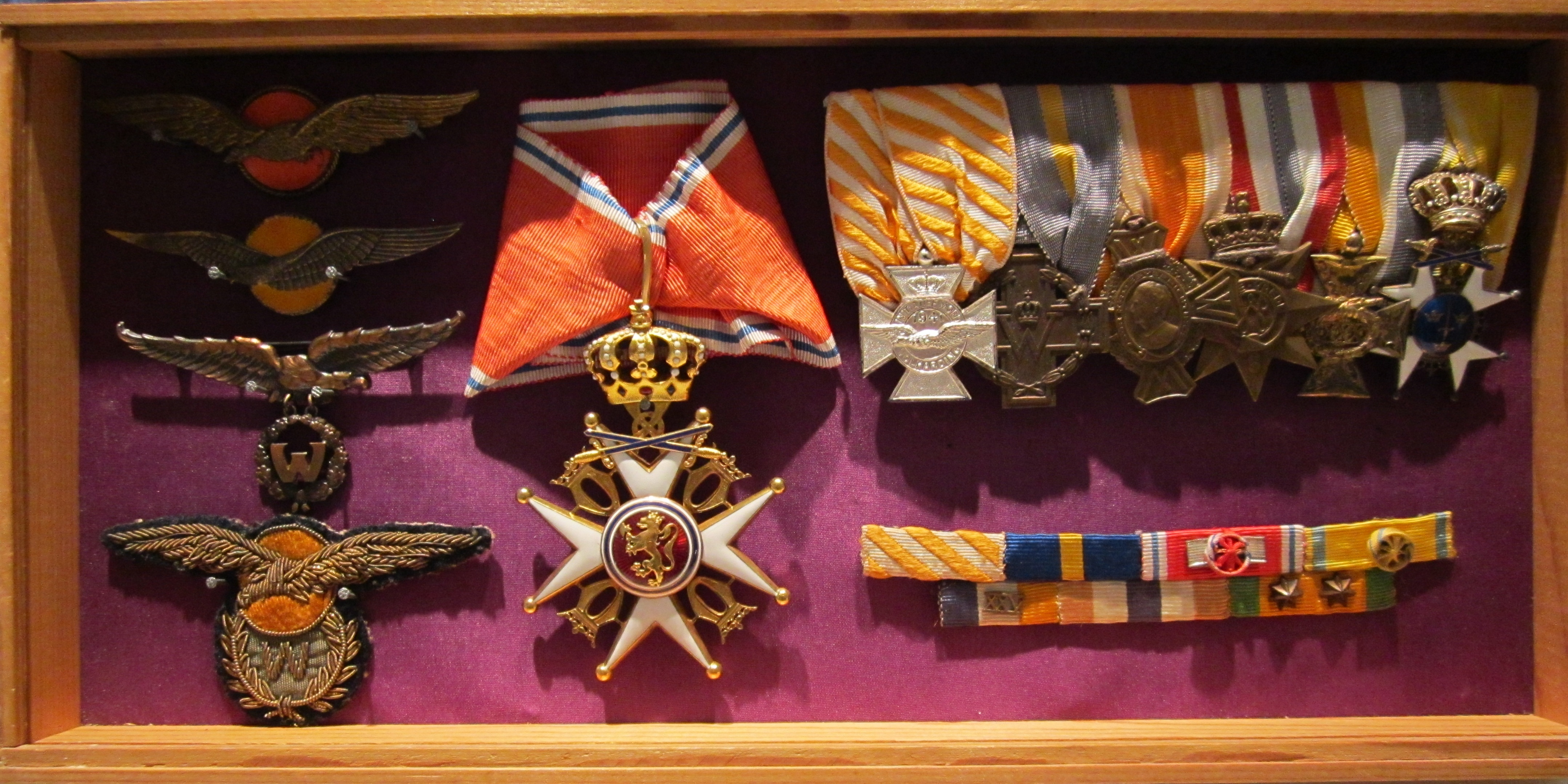
Sandbergs decorations

Sandberg's awards: On the left side, two pilot wings of the Royal Dutch Air Force, a Pilot-Observer-wing of the ML-KNIL, and an embroidered Pilot-Observer-wing of MLD-model.

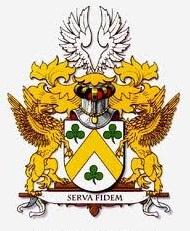
Jhr. Bodo Sandberg's noble family coat of arms

- Commander of the Royal Order of St. Olav
- Airman's Cross, 1941 (For: “Netherlands, May 10–14, 1940, attack on the Moerdijk bridges”)
- Cross of Merit (Netherlands), 1941
- Oorlogsherinneringskruis with two stars 1941
- Ereteken voor Orde en Vrede 1947
- Distinction of Honor for Long Term Service as Officer, with number 30
- Royal Order of the Sword (Sweden)
