= Ooms =

Ooms is a Dutch-language surname, derived from the word oom, meaning uncle. An alternative origin may be the given name "Omaar". People with this surname include:

- Amanda Ooms (born 1964), Swedish actress and writer
- Hendrik Ooms (1916–1993), Dutch cyclist
- Jack Ooms (1925–1999), Dutch chemical weapons researcher and diplomat
- Janus Ooms (1866–1924), Dutch rower
- Karel Ooms (1845–1900), Belgian painter
- Klaas Ooms (1917–1970), Dutch footballer
- Piet Ooms (1884–1961), Dutch swimmer and water polo player
- Willem Ooms (1897–1972), Dutch cyclist

== See also ==
- Oomen, surname of the same origin
- OOMS, the ICAO code for Muscat International Airport, Oman.
