= HNLMS K XII =

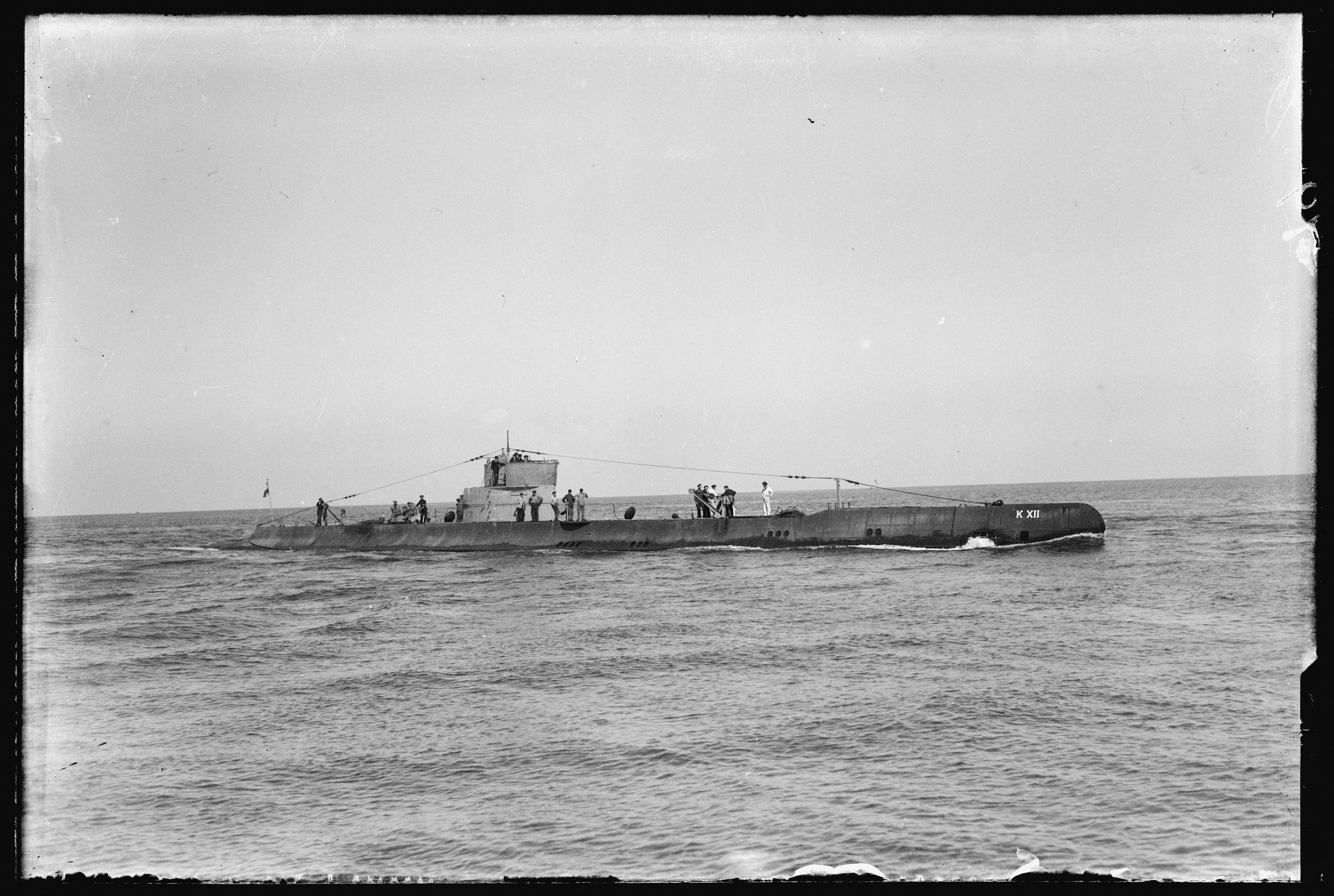
- K XII

History

Netherlands
- Name: K XII
- Builder: Fijenoord, Rotterdam
- Laid down: 9 January 1923
- Launched: 15 July 1924
- Commissioned: 19 May 1925
- Fate: Sold in 1946 and scrapped in 1951

General characteristics
- Class & type: K XI-class submarine
- Displacement: 688 tons surfaced; 828 tons submerged
- Length: 66.7 m (218 ft 10 in)
- Beam: 6.15 m (20 ft 2 in)
- Draught: 3.78 m (12 ft 5 in)
- Propulsion: 2 × 1,200 bhp (895 kW) diesel engines; 2 × 327 bhp (244 kW) electric motors
- Speed: 17 kn (31 km/h; 20 mph) surfaced; 8 kn (15 km/h; 9.2 mph) submerged
- Range: 3,500 nmi (6,500 km; 4,000 mi) at 8 kn (15 km/h; 9.2 mph) on the surface; 25 nmi (46 km; 29 mi) at 8 kn (15 km/h; 9.2 mph) submerged
- Complement: 31
- Armament: 2 × 21 inch bow torpedo tubes; 2 × 17.7 inch bow torpedo tubes; 2 × 17.7 inch stern torpedo tubes; 1 x 88 mm Bofors gun; 1 x 12.7 mm machine gun

K XII was a K XI-class patrol submarine of the Royal Netherlands Navy. The ship was built by Fijenoord shipyard in Rotterdam.

== Service history ==
The submarine was ordered on 3 September 1921 and laid down in Rotterdam at the shipyard of Fijenoord on 9 January 1923. The launch took place on 15 July 1924. On 19 May 1925 the boat was commissioned in the Dutch navy.

In September 1926 K XII left Den Helder for the Dutch East Indies. The route she took led through the Suez Canal. On 6 September 1938 she participated in a fleet review at Surabaya. The show was held in honor of the Dutch Queen Wilhelmina of the Netherlands on the 40th anniversary of her inauguration. More than twenty navy ships participated in the review.

=== World War II ===
During the war she made several patrols in the South China Sea and waters around the Dutch East Indies and Australia. Only the patrol K XII made from 7 to 16 December 1941 in the South China Sea was successful. According to American sources K XII sank or damaged the Japanese freighter Toro Maru (1,939t) on 12 December. Japanese sources name the troopship Awajisan Maru (9,794t) as the target. Dutch sources report an approximately 8,000t ship as the target but give no name. A day later on 13 December she sank the Japanese tanker Taizan Maru (3,525t).

On 6 March 1942 K XII fled Surabaya ahead of the invading Japanese forces, taking with them the naval commander of Surabaya, Pieter Koenraad, and his staff. The ship arrived in Australia on 20 March. The submarine carried out patrols for the Dutch intelligence service, including the landing of spies on the coast of Java. From June 1943 to March 1944, the K XII operated under American command and was involved in anti-submarine exercises with Australian and other Allied warships off Fremantle.

On 5 May 1944 the boat was paid off and sold in 1945.

== Australian tourist attraction ==
The K XII became a tourist attraction in Luna Park Sydney and Manly Fun Pier. After a storm in June 1949, the sub was towed to less exposed waters but the towline broke and the sub drifted ashore at Fairlight. It remained there for 18 months before being salvaged and cut up for scrap in 1951.
