= Resistance Memorial Cross =

Resistance Memorial Cross Verzetsherdenkingskruis
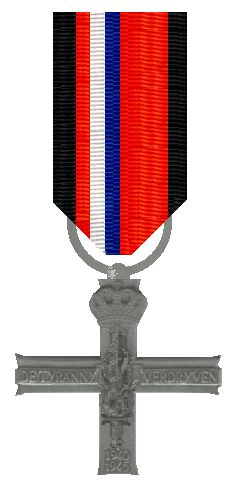
- Resistance Memorial Cross
- Type: Commemorative medal
- Presented by: The Netherlands
- Established: 29 December 1980

Highlights
- Total: 15,000
- Ribbon of the cross

Precedence
- Next (higher): War Memorial Cross
- Next (lower): Medal for Order and Peace

The Resistance Memorial Cross or Resistance Commemorative Cross (Dutch: Verzetsherdenkingskruis) is a medal awarded in the Netherlands to members of the Dutch resistance during the Second World War.

The medal was instituted by Royal Decree (No. 104) on 29 December 1980, after the 35th anniversary of the liberation of the Netherlands. It is worn after the War Memorial Cross and before the Medal for Order and Peace. The cross is only awarded at the request of a person eligible to receive it. Approximately 15,000 have been awarded, recorded in the Gedenkenboek verzetsherdenkingskruis. In 1982, the following US Army Divisions were awarded the Resistance Memorial Cross for their actions in the Second World War.:

- 2nd Armored Division
- 7th Armored Division
- 82nd Airborne Division
- 101st Airborne Division
- 30th Infantry Division
- 104th Infantry Division

== Criteria ==
The Resistance Memorial Cross may be awarded to:

- Members of resistance groups recognised in the Royal Decree dated 5 September 1944 or to any resistance group known to the Council on Extraordinary Pensions or the 1940–1945 Foundation.
- Anyone recognised by the Council on Extraordinary Pension as a participant in the resistance, regardless of whether they were awarded a pension.
- Individuals defined by the Law on the Improvement of the Legal Status of Resistance Fighters (law of 1/20/76, Stb. 19) adjudged as having spent time in service to the resistance.
- Soldiers of the Dutch Internal Armed Forces in occupied territory.
- Those who participated in actions during World War II in Japanese or Japanese-occupied territory, which after the war, were designated as resistance of the enemy by the committee.
- Anyone who does not meet any preceding provisions, may still be considered a participant in the resistance in the judgement of the committee.

== Appearance ==
The medal comprises a silver cross hung from a striped ribbon. The obverse of the cross bears a vertical flaming sword, surmounted by the Dutch royal crown. Below the sword are the dates 1940 above 1945. The horizontal arms of the cross are inscribed with the words DE TYRANNY VERDRYVEN (Dutch: "to expel tyranny"), a line in the Dutch national anthem. The reverse bears a Dutch lion, and the date of institution, 1980. The cross is suspended by a ring from a ribbon coloured with asymmetric stripes: the left half is red-white-blue (for the Dutch flag) and the right half orange (the national color of the Netherlands) with a black border on each edge.

== Notable recipients ==
- Aart Alblas
- Willem Arondeus
- Coosje Ayal
- Tex Banwell
- Ina Boekbinder
- Titus Brandsma
- Jan van Borssum Buisman
- Jaap Burger
- Boy Ecury
- Joke Folmer
- Hendrika Gerritsen
- Sietje Gravendaal-Tammens
- Karl Gröger
- Bert Haanstra
- Erik Hazelhoff Roelfzema
- Cornelis Pieter van den Hoek
- Adrian Hoekstra
- Hans Hoets
- Ernst de Jonge
- Patrick Edward de Josselin de Jong
- Ingeborg Kahlenberg
- Pieter Koenraad
- Anton de Kom
- Jan de Koning
- Hans de Koster
- Hannie van Leeuwen
- Prince Bernhard of Lippe-Biesterfeld
- Caecilia Loots
- George Maduro
- Sicco Mansholt
- Selma van de Perre
- Johannes Post
- Atie Ridder-Visser
- Hannie Schaft
- Norbert Schmelzer
- Pieter Meindert Schreuder
- Pierre Schunck
- Bram van der Stok
- Peter Tazelaar
- Christiaan Tonnet
- Marten Toonder
- Gerrit van der Veen
- Ida Veldhuyzen van Zanten
- Johan Hendrik Weidner
- Leonard Willmott
- Petrus Wijtse Winkel
- Francien de Zeeuw

== Dutch Cross of Resistance ==
It should not be confused with the rarer and more prestigious Dutch Cross of Resistance (Dutch: Verzetskruis), the second highest decoration for valour in the Netherlands, which was instituted in 1946 and awarded to only 95 people. There was a belief after the War that awarding medals would make distinctions between different acts of resistance, all of which would have been punishable by death. After a first round of awards were made of the Dutch Cross of Resistance in 1946, it became politically difficult to agree a list of further recipients.
