= Leonard Willmott =

British soldier (1921–1993)

Leonard Richard Douglas Willmott, MM, BEM (b. Battersea, London; 23 June 1921 – d. Tweed Heads, New South Wales; 24 May 1993) was a British soldier who saw active service as a signaller with the Special Operations Executive during World War II. Willmott joined the British Army whilst in his teens and rose through the ranks to gain a commission. He saw active service with distinction in Europe, including Poland in September 1939, and was awarded British, French and Dutch decorations. After his British Army service was terminated, Willmott emigrated to New Zealand where he worked in various parts of the security services.

== Early life ==
Len Willmott's parents were Arthur Willmott, formerly an army sergeant-major, and Georgette, who was half-French. The family background of Willmott senior was never confirmed – it seems certain only that he was not originally called Willmott and changed his name to ensure a complete and utter separation from his past. Early in Len Willmott's life, the family moved to Seaford in Sussex where they lived in poverty. At 7 years old, Len took on a delivery round and at 13, he joined a deep-sea fishing trawler. His relationship with his father had involved frequent beatings, so the relative care and privacy on the trawler were welcome.

== Army career ==
Willmott joined the Royal Signals as a boy apprentice on 1 July 1936, at age 15. During his time in training, he became a respected and highly skilled signaller and participated in the off-duty construction of a wireless transmitter. It is probable that in 1938, as his time as a "boy" signaller approached its end, he was "talent-spotted" for extra training which would lead to more than routine service.

Instead of the routine posting to a GPO telegraph office (to provide experience), Willmott was called to interviews at the War Office in London; this was an exceptional experience for a seventeen-year-old boy soldier. It was followed by vehicle training in London and, in early January 1939, in Paris. In March he was sent for parachute training at Reading, a rudimentary process at the time. (Willmott was paired with another trainee, an intelligence officer called Templer, later Field Marshal Sir Gerald Templer.) In late July, he was sent to Crieff in Scotland for a brief course (the house where this took place had been taken over by the Secret Intelligence Service (SIS) and became known as the "auld Spook House"), equipped in London and then sent to Germany via Harwich in mid-August, carrying a wireless transmitter in three cases.

=== Poland ===
While waiting for orders near Munich, his destination was abruptly changed to the British Embassy in Warsaw, in Poland. On 1 September, the German invasion of Poland had started and Willmott's journey to Warsaw became disrupted and difficult, he was often on foot and foraging for food. By the time he arrived, the embassy had closed and the staff had evacuated. He was given shelter by a local family and soon handed over to what became the Polish resistance; in the next few months he was either in hiding and participated in several sabotage and demolition operations. Willmott remained with the resistance until April 1940 before travelling with two other British men (probably SIS agents) through Germany, Belgium and France to neutral Spain, and returning to Britain on a destroyer, in July. While passing through Germany he had posed as an American and obtained help from an English-speaking German officer.

== Awards and decorations ==
- Military Medal (3 February 1944)
- British Empire Medal (14 October 1943)
- Croix de Guerre with gold star (France, 1945)
- Bronze Lion (Netherlands, 5 September 1946)
- Resistance Commemorative Cross (Netherlands, 31 October 1986)
