= Bep Stenger =

Dutch aid worker

- Born: 30 July 1922; Cimahi, Dutch East Indies
- Died: 13 November 2016 (aged 94); Dongen, the Netherlands
- Occupations: Aid worker, resistance member

Elisabeth Pieternella Maria "Bep" Stenger (30 July 1922 – 13 November 2016) was a Dutch aid worker with the Red Cross in Surabaya, the Dutch East Indies (present-day Indonesia). During World War II, she became involved in the resistance against the Japanese when her father, an officer of the Royal Netherlands East Indies Army (KNIL), became a prisoner of war following the Dutch East Indies campaign.

== Resistance ==
During the Japanese occupation of the Dutch East Indies, KNIL captain W.A. Meelhuysen, known by the code name Tahir, led an anti-Japanese resistance cell under the cover of the Red Cross. This organization was called Corsica and was intended to coordinate the scattered resistance groups in East Java. Meelhuysen was a family friend of the Stengers. When Bep Stenger could no longer go to school in Malang after the occupation by the Japanese, she joined the Red Cross as a volunteer. In this role, Bep collected military clothing and weapons from KNIL officers' wives whom she knew through her father.

Resistance against the Japanese in the East Indies remained localized, however, and the Indonesians were largely indifferent. Meelhuysen was arrested and on 22 December 1942 he committed suicide in his cell to avoid betraying others during torture. Nonetheless, most resistance members were arrested, including Bep Stenger who was arrested on 13 March 1943. At the end of that year she was handed down a sentence by the Japanese military court. Along with Gody Meelhuysen, captain Meelhuysen's sister-in-law, Stenger was sentenced to 10 years imprisonment and her male co-defendants were sentenced to death. Among them were Flip Bernard, Ferry Pleyel, Bruno Berler and six others. They were beheaded on 31 January 1944. Stenger and Meelhuysen were sent to Bulu prison in Semarang, Central Java.

== Bersiap period ==
Stenger remained a prisoner in Bulu until the surrender of Japan on 15 August 1945. Through the subsequent Bersiap period, the violent and chaotic start of the Indonesian National Revolution, she and the other detainees stayed on prison grounds until the end of September 1945. They were then set free and Stenger returned to Surabaya by train, where she arrived on 2 October 1945. Groups of evacuees were concentrated here under the protection of troops of the British Indian Army. At the time of the Battle of Surabaya between British troops and Indonesian nationalists, Stenger was still in the city. On 10 November 1945, Stenger, along with a group of Europeans, managed to escape the fighting aboard a British warship. This ship took them to Singapore, then part of the British Straits Settlements.

After the Bersiap period, Stenger went to Sumatra in 1948, where she lived until 1950. After the marriage with her first husband broke down, she moved to the Netherlands. Here she came to live in Voorschoten, South Holland.

== See also ==
- Coosje Ayal – another notable female resistance fighter in the Dutch East Indies during World War II
