= Selma van de Perre =

Dutch resistance fighter (1922–2025)

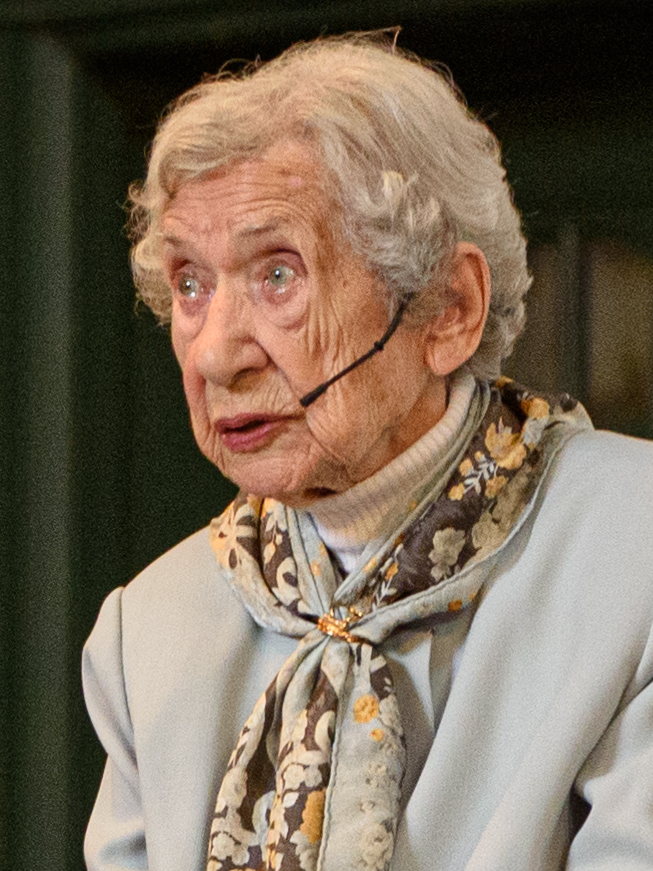
- Van de Perre in 2022
- Born: Selma Velleman; 7 June 1922; Amsterdam, Netherlands
- Died: 20 October 2025 (aged 103); London, England
- Other names: Wil Buter; Marga van der Kuit
- Occupations: Dutch resistance fighter; Journalist
- Notable work: Mijn naam is Selma
- Spouse: Hugo van de Perre (m. 1955; died 1979)

Selma van de Perre-Velleman (7 June 1922 – 20 October 2025) was a Dutch–British resistance fighter. During the Second World War, she worked as a courier, a term that at the time acquired a specific connotation as "messenger of the resistance".

== Early life ==
Van de Perre was born in Amsterdam on 7 June 1922 the daughter of actor, singer and presenter Barend Velleman and his wife Fem Spier, who had trained as a milliner. She had two elder brothers, David and Louis, and a younger sister, Clara. The family was liberal and, while Jewish, were not practising Jews. Her father had renounced the Jewish faith. Her elder brother sailed with the Dutch Steamboat Company during the war; her younger brother was in England. In 1942, Van de Perre was called to report to work in a fur factory that supplied the German army, but she managed to get an exemption. When her father was arrested later that year and taken to Camp Westerbork, she helped her mother and sister to go into hiding in Eindhoven.

== Resistance ==
After her mother and sister Clara were arrested in 1943, Van de Perre joined the Resistance and became a member of the "TD Group", a Dutch resistance organization. She operated under the alias Wil Buter, and later as Margareta ("Marga") van der Kuit, performing courier work throughout the Netherlands with suitcases containing newsletters and pamphlets; and money, food stamps and fake identity cards for people in hiding. In June 1944 she was betrayed and arrested. Officials did not know of her Jewish heritage and she was interned as a political prisoner. She was sent to Ravensbrück concentration camp in north-east Germany via Camp Vught, and while interned she was severely beaten and was not expected to survive. After recovering, now suffering from typhus and dysentery, she applied for work in the production hall of Siemens & Halske AG because conditions there were better. In April 1945 Ravensbruck was liberated by the Russian Army and through the Swedish Red Cross Van de Perre was taken to Gothenburg, where she revealed that her name was Selma Velleman. She worked with the authorities in Sweden who were helping to repatriate liberated prisoners. When she returned to the Netherlands, she learned that her parents, sister and other family members had been murdered in Auschwitz and Sobibór.

== After the war ==
In 1947 Van de Perre was sent to London and found work at the Dutch embassy with the assistance of her brother David, who had been posted to England. She studied anthropology and sociology at the London School of Economics, and after graduating became a teacher of sociology and mathematics at Sacred Heart High School, Hammersmith, London. She joined the Dutch section of the BBC World Service (BBC Radio Netherlands) as a journalist, where she met her future husband, Hugo van de Perre, a Belgian journalist, the son of the founder of De Standaard, Alfons van de Perre. They married in 1955 and had a son. After her husband died suddenly in 1979, Van de Perre continued his work as a foreign correspondent. She settled in London and became a British citizen. Until her retirement she worked as a journalist for the BBC and as a correspondent for AVRO Televizier and De Standaard.

Van de Perre visited Amsterdam every year to lay flowers on behalf of the Dutch Ravensbruck Committee. From 1995 onwards she returned to Ravensbrück for one week every year to talk about the war with Dutch and German students. At the urging of her brothers' children she began writing her autobiography, My Name is Selma, in 2003. The book was released in the Netherlands in 2020 under the title Mijn naam is Selma. In 1983 Van de Perre was awarded the Resistance Memorial Cross, a medal awarded in the Netherlands to members of the Dutch resistance during the Second World War. In 2021 she was awarded the Order of Orange-Nassau by the Dutch government.

Van de Perre turned 100 on 7 June 2022. She died in London on 20 October 2025, at the age of 103.
