= King's Medal for Courage in the Cause of Freedom =

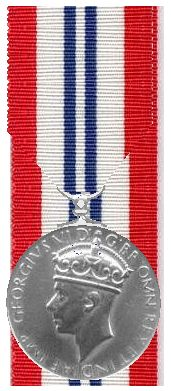
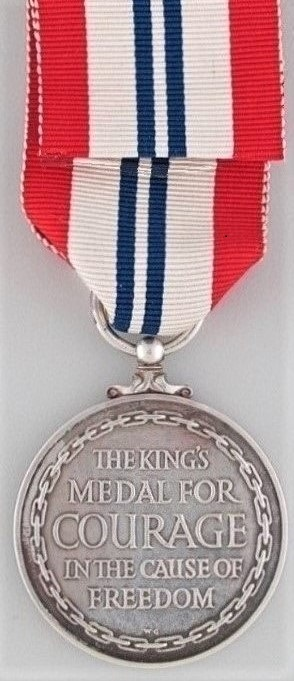
- The obverse and reverse of the medal, with the obverse mounted in "Court Style"
- Type: Civil decoration
- Awarded for: Acts of courage in support of the British and Allied cause
- Description: Silver disk, 36mm diameter.
- Presented by: United Kingdom of Great Britain and Northern Ireland
- Eligibility: Foreign nationals
- Campaign: World War II
- Established: 23 August 1945

Highlights
- Total: 3,200
- Ribbon bar

Precedence
- Next (lower): King's Medal for Service in the Cause of Freedom
- Related: Allied Subjects' Medal

The King's Medal for Courage in the Cause of Freedom is a British medal for award to foreign nationals who aided the Allied effort during the Second World War.

== Eligibility ==
Instituted on 23 August 1945, the medal was a reward to foreign nationals for acts of courage in furtherance of the interests of the British and Allied cause during the Second World War. Many were awarded to members of resistance groups in German-occupied Europe, including for helping British servicemen evade the enemy or escape from occupied areas, and for supplying key intelligence. The award was open not only to civilians, but also to military personnel for services outside the scope of normal military duties.

Distribution of the medal began in 1947. Around 3,200 medals were awarded.

People who had made a deserving effort to further the British and Allied cause during World War II in less dangerous ways were eligible for the award of the King's Medal for Service in the Cause of Freedom.

== Description ==
The medal is silver, circular and 36 mm in diameter. The obverse shows a left facing crowned portrait of King George VI, surrounded by the inscription "GEORGIVS VI D: G: BR: OMN: REX ET INDIAE IMP:" The reverse bears the inscription "THE KING'S / MEDAL FOR / COURAGE / IN THE CAUSE OF / FREEDOM" in five lines, with the word courage in larger font than other words. The inscription is surrounded by a chain. The medal is suspended from a ring and has a 32 mm wide white ribbon with two narrow blue centre stripes and red edge stripes.

The medal was awarded unnamed.

== Notable recipients ==
- Janine de Greef (1925–2020), a member of the Comet Line in the Belgian resistance, exfiltrating evacuees and Allied airmen from occupied Belgium to Spain.
- Elisabeth Barbier (1912–1968), French resistance leader
- Catherine Dior (1917–2008), a member of a Polish intelligence unit based in France, and sister of the fashion designer Christian Dior.
- George Doundoulakis (1921–2007), Greek American physicist and OSS agent who aided British soldiers after the Battle of Crete, led a Cretan organisation under Christopher Montague Woodhouse, Thomas Dunbabin, and Patrick Leigh Fermor, and designed the Arecibo Antenna, the world's largest radio telescope
- Lykele Faber (1919–2009), Dutch commando and radio operator who took part in the Battle of Arnhem and helped organise the Dutch resistance.
- Rachel Harel (1923–1989), courier for the Dutch resistance.
- Petrus Wijtse Winkel (1909–2012), Dutch East Indies administrator who rescued shipwrecked Britons and allowed them to escape the Japanese invaders by giving them his boat.

== See also ==
- Allied Subjects' Medal (World War I)
- King's Medal for Service in the Cause of Freedom
- Medal of Freedom (USA)
- Tedder certificate
