= Petrus Wijtse Winkel =

Dutch colonial administrator (1909–2012)

- Born: Petrus Wijtse Winkel; 13 June 1909; Leeuwarden, Netherlands
- Died: 21 April 2012 (aged 102); Leeuwarden, Netherlands
- Other name: Tangan Dingin (Malay) "Fortunate Hand"
- Education: Indology
- Alma mater: Utrecht University
- Occupation: Colonial administrator
- Years active: 1928–1950
- Known for: Saving many shipwrecked Britons in 1941
- Spouse: Detty Ronner
- Awards: King's Medal for Courage in the Cause of Freedom (1949); Cross for Order and Peace (1949); Resistance Memorial Cross (1985)

Petrus Wijtse Winkel (13 June 1909 – 21 April 2012) was a Dutch colonial administrator in the Netherlands East Indies and centenarian. He is known for helping British military personnel escape the Dutch East Indies under Japanese occupation.

== Life ==
Winkel was born in Leeuwarden, Netherlands. He was the son of Jan Peter Winkel, a detective with the Leeuwarden police, and Ymkje Welbedagt, a homemaker. Winkel attended the Hogereburgerschool in Leeuwarden.

=== In the East Indies ===
Winkel was conscripted into the Royal Netherlands Army in 1928 and served in Java before joining the colonial administration. A few years later he returned to the Netherlands to study indology at Utrecht University. Winkel went back to the Dutch Indies in 1937, this time accompanied by his younger brother Wijtse Petrus, an artist. During his career from 1930 to 1950, Winkel held several government positions including that of assistant-resident of Nias. He is credited with saving the lives of many Britons in 1941. British troopship Chilka, commanded by one Captain Bird sank in battle with a Japanese navy ship which thus shipwrecked the crew. Winkel saved the crew and by giving them his boat, allowed them to escape to British India. In 1942 Winkel was deported to a civilian internment camp in the jungle of Sumatra. He barely survived the lack of food in the disease-ridden camp. His actions earned him the King's Medal for Courage in the Cause of Freedom, a British medal awarded for "contributions to helping British military personnel to escape the enemy and escape from occupied areas, with the danger of life, or for other dangerous work for the British or Allied cause during the war", in 1949. He also received two Dutch decorations, the Cross for Order and Peace in 1949 and the Resistance Memorial Cross in 1985.

=== Personal and death ===
After the war he returned to his fatherland, married Detty Ronner (1918–2008) in 1955 by whom he had a daughter (born 1956).

Winkel spent his last years in an elderly home in his place of birth Leeuwarden. In 2009, he celebrated his 100th birthday. Petrus Wijtse ('Wytze') Winkel died on 21 April 2012 in Leeuwarden. He outlived his sister (1914–2004) and younger brother (1911–2011), who reached the age of 100.
