= King's Medal for Service in the Cause of Freedom =

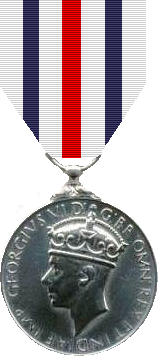
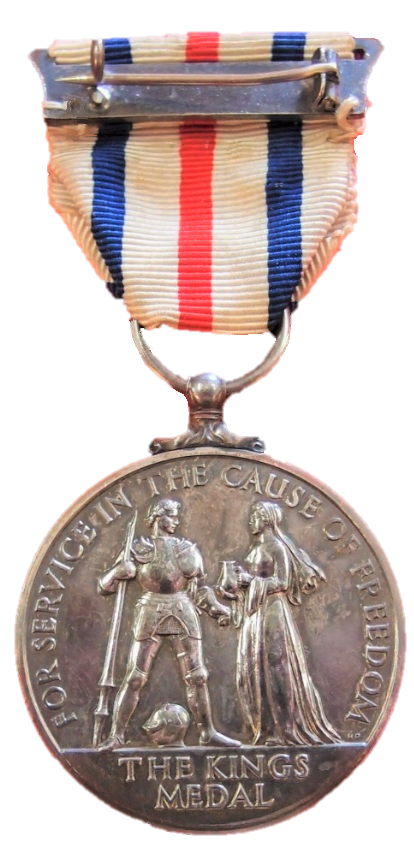
- King's Medal, obverse and reverse
- Type: Civil decoration.
- Awarded for: Meritorious service in furtherance of the interests of the British Commonwealth in the allied cause
- Description: Silver disk, 36mm diameter.
- Presented by: United Kingdom of Great Britain and Northern Ireland
- Eligibility: Foreign nationals, mostly civilians
- Campaign: World War II
- Established: 23 August 1945

Highlights
- Total: 2,539
- Ribbon bar of the medal

Precedence
- Next (higher): King's Medal for Courage in the Cause of Freedom
- Related: Allied Subjects' Medal

The King's Medal for Service in the Cause of Freedom is a British medal instituted by King George VI on 23 August 1945. It was awarded to civilian foreign nationals, mainly of allied countries, who had given meritorious service to further the interests of the British Commonwealth or the Allied cause during World War II. Activities recognised included fund raising for British war relief, scientific research that aided the war effort and organising ambulance services. The medal was awarded 2,539 times.

The medal is silver and 36 millimetres (1.4 in) in diameter. The obverse bears the left facing crowned effigy of King George VI with the inscription 'GEORGIVS VI D:G:BR:OMN:REX ET INDIAE IMP'. The reverse shows a medieval warrior in armour carrying a broken lance, being offered sustenance by a woman. The upper circumference is inscribed 'FOR SERVICE IN THE CAUSE OF FREEDOM', with 'THE KINGS MEDAL' below. The medal was awarded unnamed.

The medal has a ring suspension. The 32 millimetres (1.3 in) wide ribbon is white with a central red stripe, flanked by blue stripes.

Those who helped British military personnel to escape the enemy, return from occupied areas or for other dangerous work for the British or Allied cause during the war were eligible for the King's Medal for Courage in the Cause of Freedom.

== Notable recipients ==
- Grace Macurdy (1866-1946). Awarded in 1946 for her role in Greek and British war relief.
- John G. Trump (1907-1985). Awarded in 1947 for his research and creation of radar detection technology used during World War II.
- Ann Wood-Kelly (1918-2006). Awarded in 1946 for her service as a ferry pilot with the British Air Transport Auxiliary, she delivering to airfields more than 900 new and repaired aircraft of 75 different types.
