= Oomen =

Oomen is a Dutch-language surname, derived from the word oom, meaning uncle. An alternative origin may be the given name "Omaar". People with this surname include:

- Erica Oomen (born 1950s), Dutch track racing cyclist
- Ria Oomen-Ruijten (born 1950), Dutch CDA politician and MEP
- Sam Oomen (born 1995), Dutch road racing cyclist
- Wilhelm Josef Oomens (1918–2008), Dutch Jesuit and painter

== See also ==
- Zentveld & Oomen, Dutch dance production team
- Ooms, surname of the same origin
