= Engelandvaarder =

Left the Netherlands in World War II for England to fight the Germans

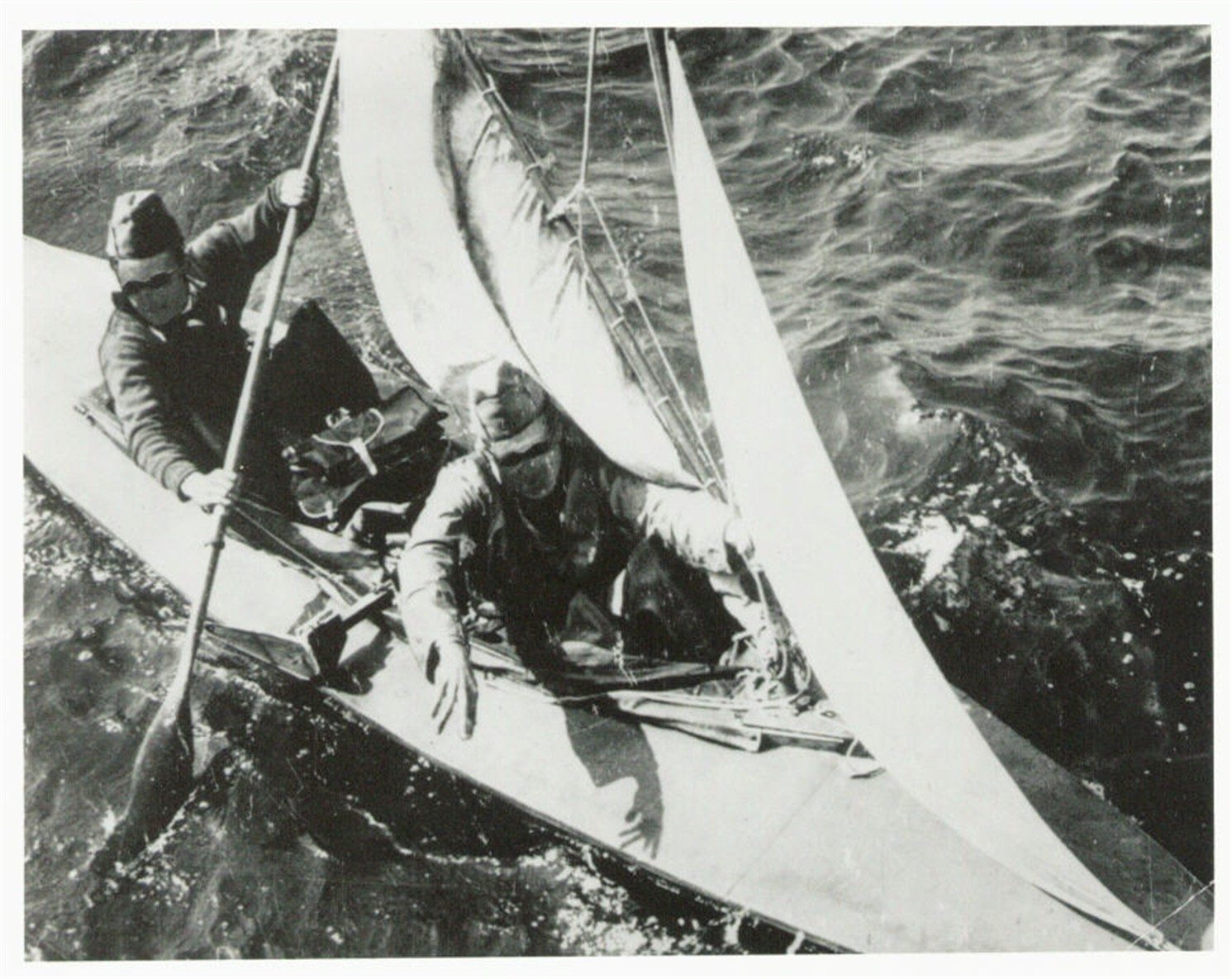
Jaap van Hamel and Rudi van Daalen Wetters left Katwijk on 19 June 1941. HMS Eglinton picked them up on 24 June and brought them to Lowestoft.

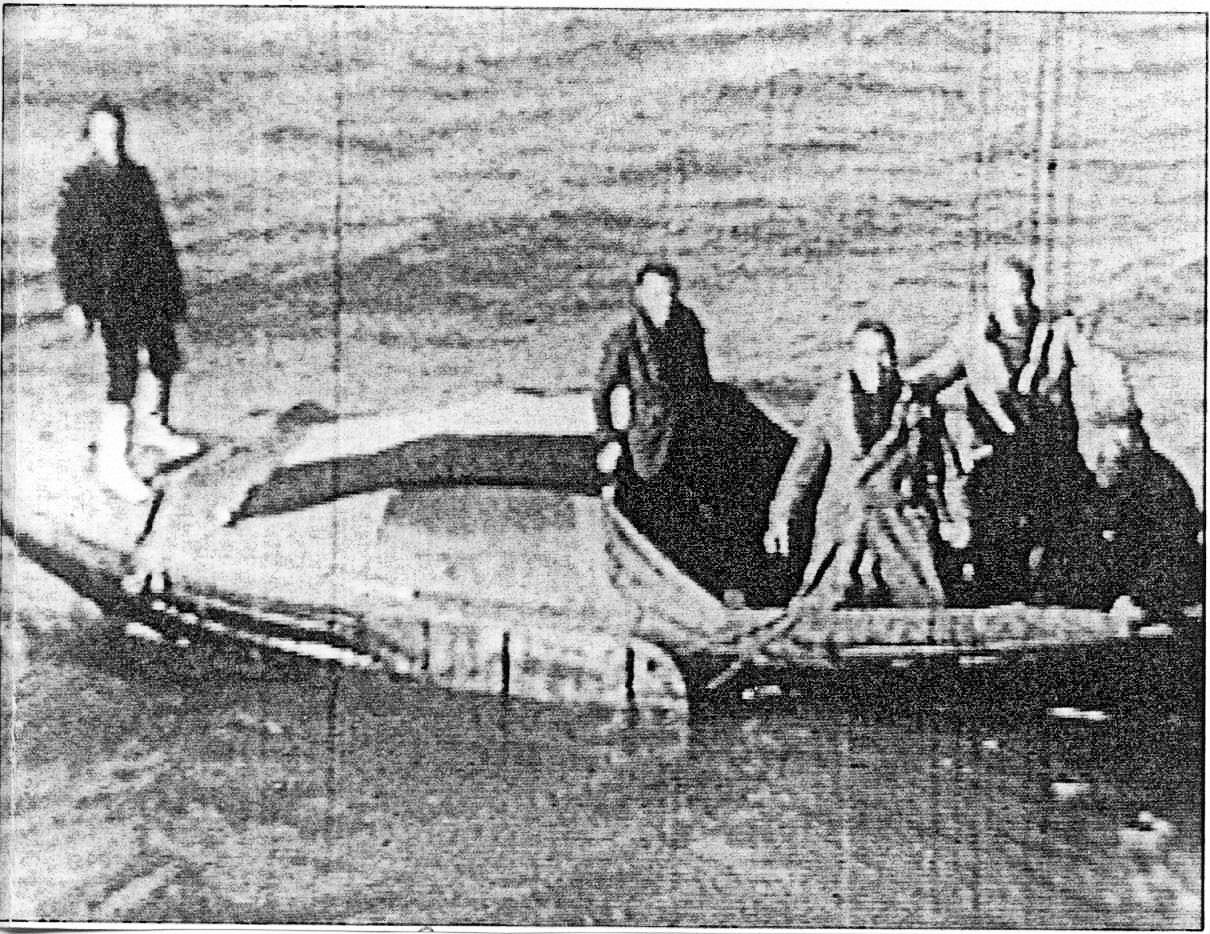
These five Engelandvaarders also made it to Lowestoft in 1944

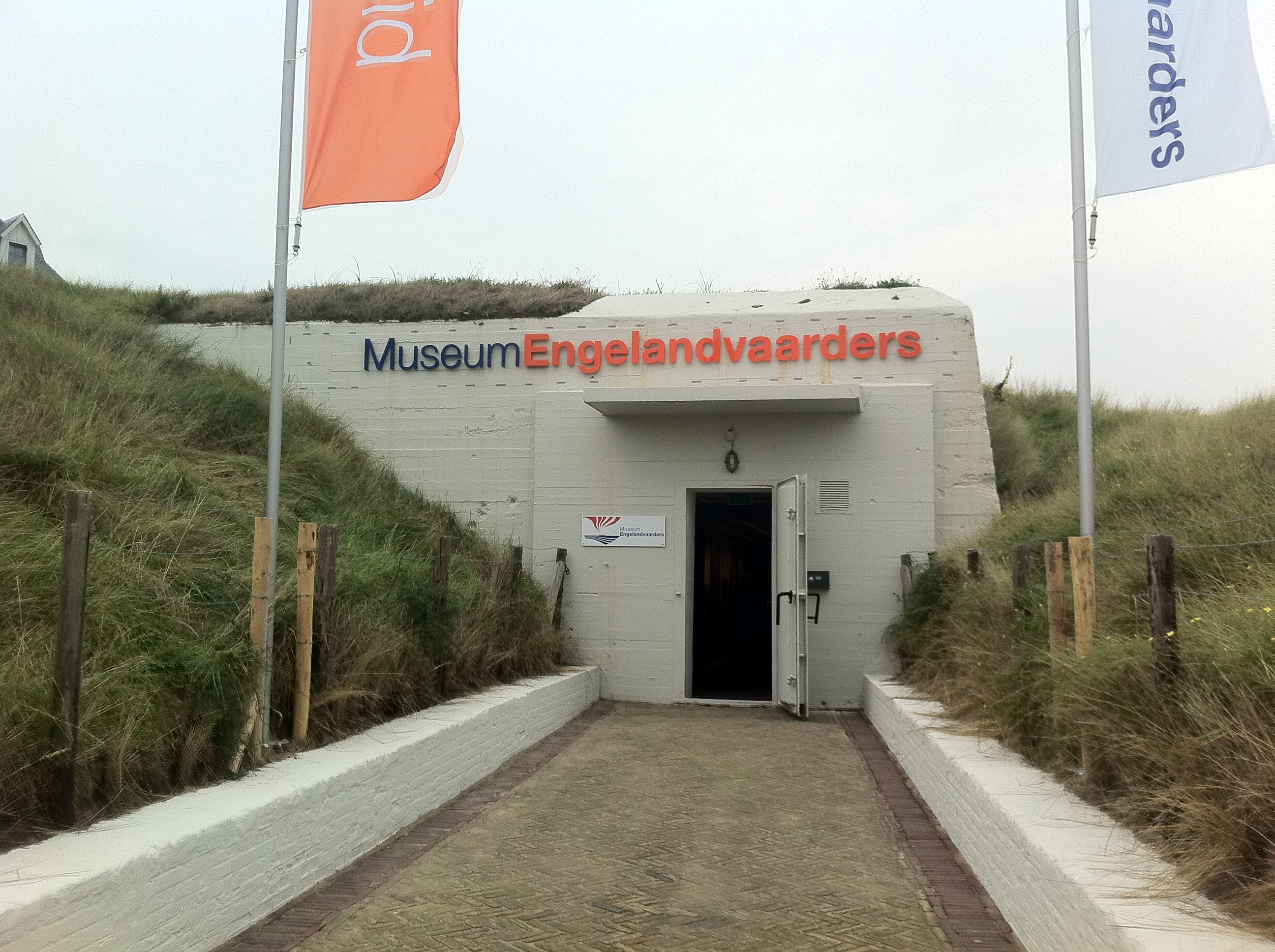
Museum Engelandvaarders

An Engelandvaarder (Dutch pronunciation: [ˈɛŋəlɑntˌfaːrdər]; lit. 'Sailor to England') was a Dutch person who escaped from the German-occupied Netherlands to the United Kingdom during World War II with the intention of joining the Free Dutch forces. The name derives from the earliest such attempts involving people who paddled 100 miles across the North Sea. Only about one in ten were successful in the crossing, with most just disappearing in the sea. Once they reached England many joined the Allied forces to help free their country from Nazi Germany.

In July 1940 three Dutchmen escaped from the occupied Netherlands and crossed the North Sea to England in a twelve-foot boat. They were called "Engelandvaarders". This first success encouraged many others to try the crossing. Most of these disappeared and were never heard from again. With time, land routes out of the Netherlands developed, and a number of the Dutch reached England by traveling overland from safe house to safe house to reach southern France, Spain, Portugal, Switzerland or Sweden and from the neutral country transited to England.

A large number of men and women, however, were killed or arrested on their way to England. Many died at sea. Some were captured by the Germans. Of these, some were shot, but most were deported to concentration camps. Some escaped from detention, such as Bram van der Stok, the most successful Dutch fighter pilot in World War II, who escaped with Bodo Sandberg and four other Engelandvaarders from the prisoner of war camp Stalag Luft III, in a car stolen from the camp commander. Many others were taken to death camps, of whom only a few returned to the Netherlands after the liberation.

Upon arriving in England these Engelandvaarders were interrogated by British secret service to be sure Nazi Germany had not slipped a secret agent among their number. This was done in London at the "London Reception Centre" in the building over a period of four years. Once they cleared the interview process they all had a meeting with Queen Wilhelmina, who viewed them as her window back to her homeland. A number of the Engelandvaarders were awarded the Dutch Bronze Cross (BK) or the Cross of Merit (KV).

Over 1,700 Dutch men and women overcame many difficulties to reach England. Of these 332 joined the Royal Army, 118 the Royal Air Force, 397 the Royal Navy, 176 the Royal Netherlands East Indies Army (KNIL), 164 the merchant navy, 129 served with the Dutch government-in-exile in London and 111 became secret agents and returned to occupied Netherlands.

== Notable Engelandvaarders ==
- Aart Alblas MWO, BK
- Jaap Burger, BK
- Erik Hazelhoff Roelfzema MWO, KV
- Piet Kasteel
- Hans Larive MWO, BK
- Ernst Moltzer
- Jack Ooms
- Charles Pahud de Mortanges
- Hugo Pos
- Han Stijkel
- Peter Tazelaar MWO
- Bram van der Stok, BK
- Gerrit Jan van Heuven Goedhart
- Ida Veldhuyzen van Zanten
- Alphons Wijnen

== Museum Engelandvaarders ==
On 4 September 2015 the Museum Engelandvaarders was inaugurated by King Willem-Alexander in the Dutch town of Noordwijk to commemorate the Engelandvaarders. The museum is in a former munition bunker which was part of the Atlantic Wall.

== Soldier of Orange ==
The Soldier of Orange (book) (Soldaat van Oranje) is a book written by Erik Hazelhoff Roelfzema, first published in 1971. In 1977 the book was made into a movie by Dutch director Paul Verhoeven. It starred Rutger Hauer in the part of Erik.

In 2010 it was produced on the stage as a musical. The musical is performed in a Theaterhangar on the former airfield Valkenburg near Katwijk and has since attracted more than 3 million visitors. The running date has been extended multiple times.

== Bibliography ==
- Tucker, Spencer C. World War II: The Definitive Encyclopedia and Document Collection Santa Barbara, California : ABC-CLIO, (2014).
