= Pieter Koenraad =

Dutch Naval Officer

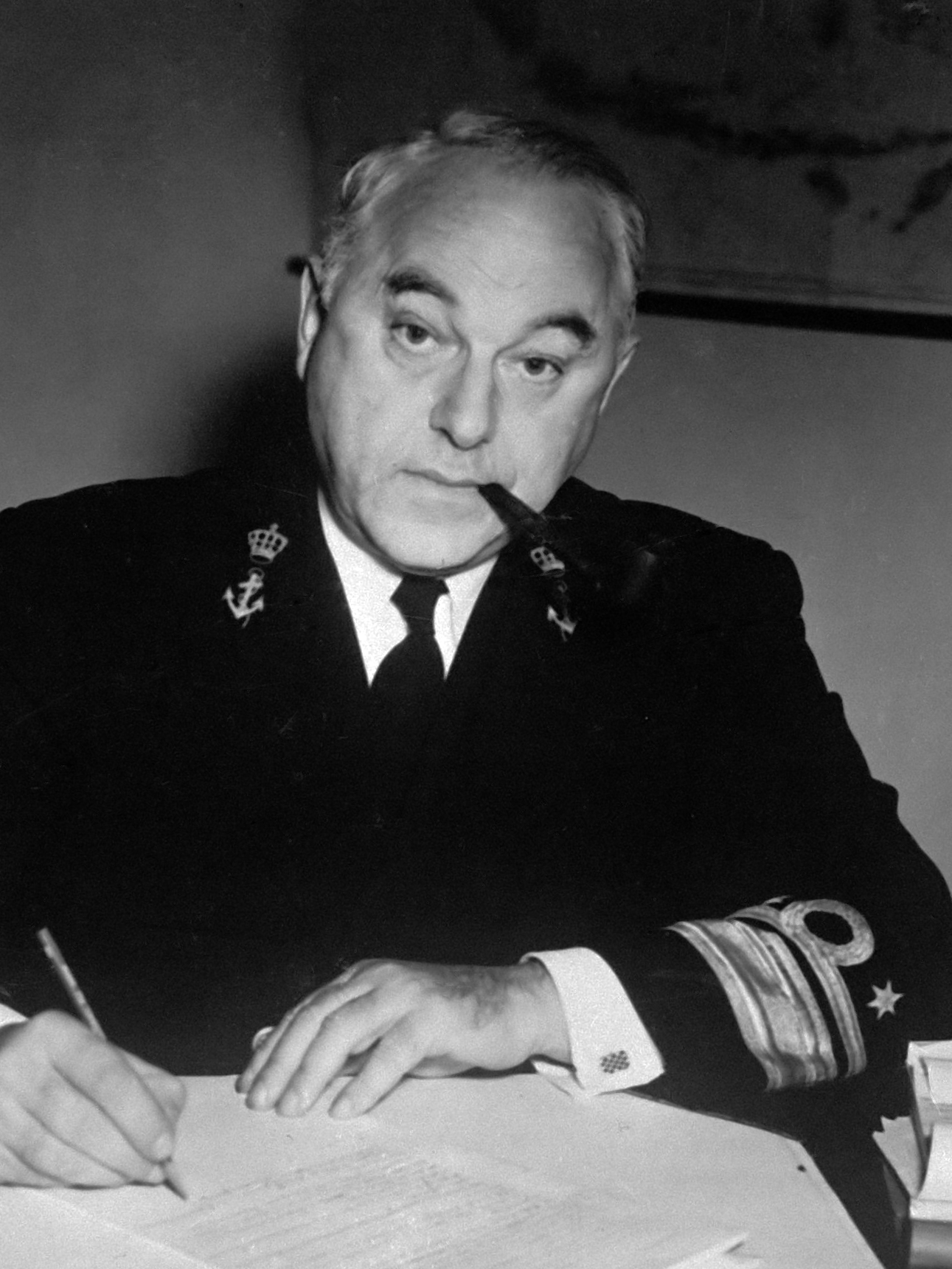
- Pieter Koenraad in May 1945
- Born: 6 June 1890; Dirksland, Netherlands
- Died: 22 February 1968 (aged 77) Las Palmas, Canary Islands
- Allegiance: Netherlands
- Branch: Royal Netherlands Navy
- Service: 1911–1946
- Rank: Rear admiral
- Conflicts: World War II; Dutch East Indies Campaign; Japanese occupation of the Dutch East Indies; New Guinea Campaign
- Awards: Order of the Netherlands Lion; Order of Orange-Nassau; Resistance Memorial Cross; Mobilization Cross 1914-1918; Service Cross for naval officers

Pieter Koenraad (6 June 1890 – 22 February 1968) was a Dutch Naval Officer, the Rear-Admiral of naval forces in the Dutch East Indies between 1943 and 1946, during World War II. Before the Japanese invasion of the Dutch East Indies, he was the flag officer in command of the important naval base at Soerabaja.

== Biography ==
=== Early career ===
Pieter Koenraad was born in Dirksland, Netherlands, son of Johannes Adrianus Koenraad, head teacher, and Alida Elizabeth de Graaff. Koenraad started his training as a naval officer at the Royal Institute for the Navy in Den Helder in 1908. On 23 August 1911 he was appointed officer. He served first in the Dutch West Indies and then alternately between the Netherlands and the Dutch East Indies, both on shore and on board ships. In the East, he became successively commander of a torpedo boat hunter, then commander of the Oedjong Naval Barracks near Soerabaja, and finally commander of a division of torpedo boat hunters.

=== Personal life ===
From 1923 to 1930, Koenraad was married to Catharina Cornelia van Trooijen. The marriage ended in 1930, soon after the birth of their daughter. That same year, Koenraad married Gertrud Maria Eugelink, with whom he had two daughters, one of which would die young.

=== World War II ===
At the outbreak of the war with Japan, he was the Commander of an important naval base in Soerabaja. He realised the invasion of Java was just a matter of time, and started to prepare the evacuation of naval personnel to Ceylon or Australia. When the time came, there was more or less a plan ready for execution. Koenraad and his staff embarked on the submarine K-XII, which made it to Australia safely in March 1942, and from there he left for England. Upon returning to Australia Koenraad replaced Rear-Admiral (Acting) F.W. Coster as Flag Officer in charge of all Dutch naval forces in the area. with headquarters in Melbourne, from 1 May 1943 to 1 October 1945; until November 1943 he was also Deputy Commander of Dutch East Indies Armed Forces. After having been temporarily promoted to Rear Admiral, this appointment became effective on 1 November 1943. From 6 October 1945 to 21 January 1946, Koenraad continued his task as the Acting Commander of the Navy in the Dutch East Indies, with its headquarters in Batavia. On 1 May 1946, he retired, being at the same time promoted to the honorary rank of Vice-admiral.

Although Koenraad was not a particularly powerful military figure, in March 1942, during the evacuation of the navy from the Dutch East Indies, he acted independently and responsively, so that he and his naval staff were able to evade capture by the Japanese. In Australia his task was mostly administrative; the operational command over the Dutch naval units present being overseen by the Americans. The lack of communication with the Commander of the Dutch East Indies Armed Forces, Vice-admiral Helfrich in Colombo (Ceylon) did not facilitate his task. However Koenraad did not lack personal courage; more than once he participated in flights from Australia to the occupied Dutch East Indies.

=== Post-war ===
He died on 22 February 1968, at the age of 65, in Las Palmas, Canary Islands.

== Honors and awards ==
- Order of the Netherlands Lion
- Order of Orange-Nassau
- Resistance Memorial Cross
- Service Cross for naval officers, for 30 years of service
- Mobilization Cross 1914–1918
- Officer in the Order of Nichan-Iftikhar of Tunis
