= Ann Wood-Kelly =

- Born: Ann Wood; 31 March 1918; Philadelphia, Pennsylvania, United States
- Died: 14 May 2006 (aged 88)
- Occupation: Aviator

Ann Wood-Kelly (née Wood; 31 March 1918 – 14 May 2006) was an American aviator who flew with the British Air Transport Auxiliary in the Second World War.

== Early life ==
Ann Wood was born in Philadelphia in 1918 and was educated there and at Namur, Belgium. When she returned to the United States she continued her education at Melrose Academy, Philadelphia and then graduated from D’Youville College, Buffalo, New York with a degree in English literature in 1938.

== Aviator ==
She gained a place on the Bowdoin College flight training program in 1941 and after eight hours of flying went solo. Wood-Kelly then stayed with the college and became a flight instructor. Jacqueline Cochran a pioneer female aviator tried to form an American auxiliary with female pilots, but with little interest from the authorities she recruited 24 women, including Wood-Kelly to sail to the United Kingdom to join the British Air Transport Auxiliary (ATA).

During her time as a ferry pilot with the ATA she flew more than 900 aircraft of 75 different types ranging from the single-engined Supermarine Spitfire fighter to the four-engined Avro Lancaster heavy bomber. In 1946, she was awarded the King's Medal for Service in the Cause of Freedom for her services to the United Kingdom.

After the war she became an assistant to the United States Air attaché in London before she returned to the United States. She became a public relations manager for Northeast Airlines, and later worked for Pan American Airways, becoming their first female vice-president.

== Family and later life ==
She married airline executive Jackson Kelly in 1948 and had a son but the marriage was dissolved.

In her last ten years she travelled around the United States giving lectures on her experiences and in 2005 D'Youville College awarded her an honorary doctorate. She died on 14 April 2006 aged 88.
