= Rachel Harel =

Member of the Dutch resistance (1923–1989)

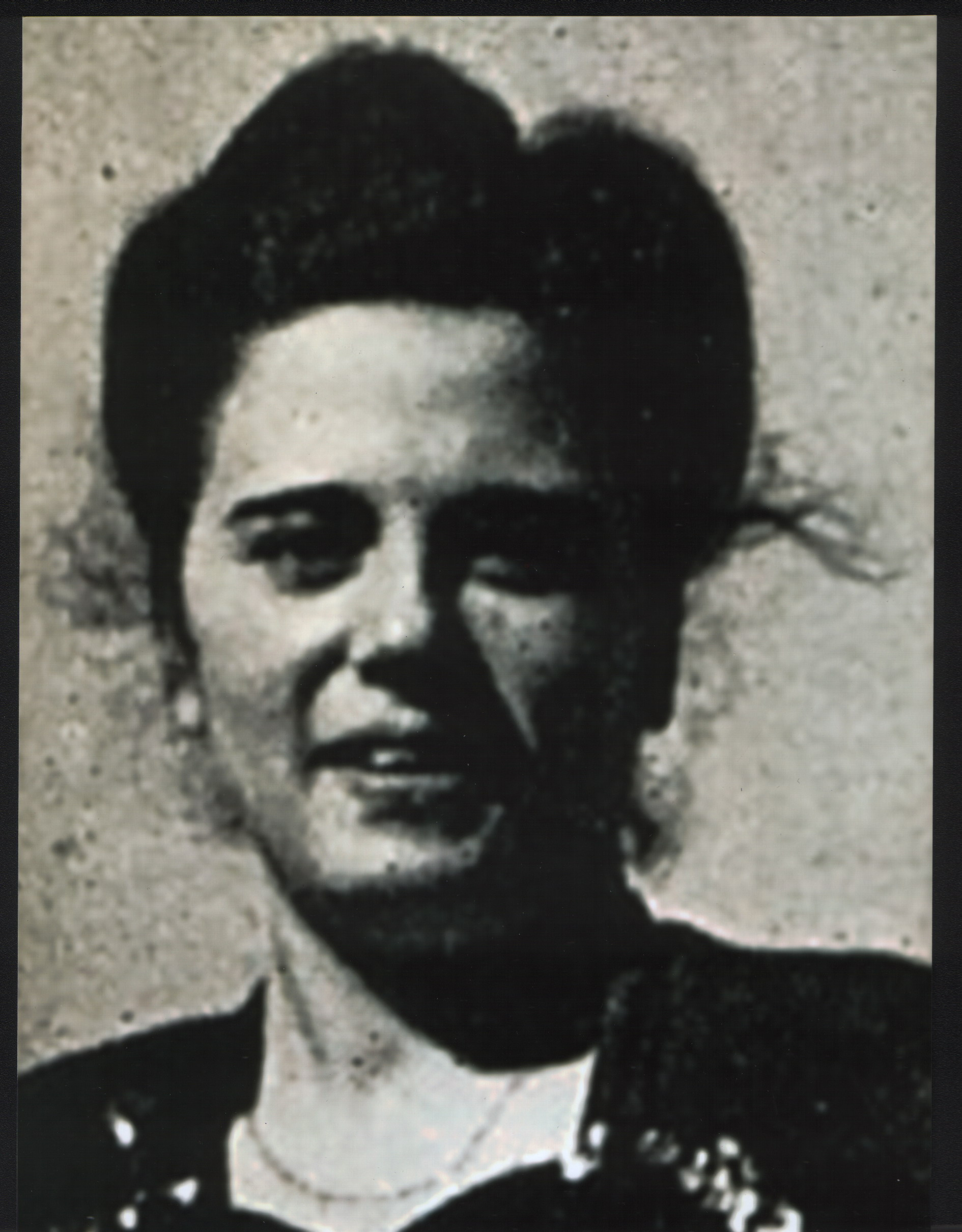
- Didi Rachel Harel
- Born: Rachel Roos; April 13, 1923; Rotterdam, the Netherlands
- Died: November 16, 1989 (aged 66); Herzliya, Israel
- Spouse: Moshe Harel

Rachel "Didi" Harel (née Roos; Hebrew: רחל "דידי" הראל; 13 April 1923, Rotterdam, the Netherlands – 16 November 1989, Herzliya, Israel), was a member of the Dutch Resistance against the Nazis during World War II, and was awarded the American Medal of Freedom and the British King's Medal for Courage in the Cause of Freedom.

== Biography ==
Rachel "Didi" Roos was born in Rotterdam, the second child of the Roos family. When she was four years old her father died, and three years later her mother married Louis Strauss. The parents were convinced that after elementary school, she should financially contribute to the family's income. Rachel fought for her rights to an education with the support of her school's principal. She graduated and became a kindergarten teacher, specializing in Montessori education.

In August 1941, Rachel became engaged to the architect Marcel "Moshe" Hertz, taking the name Rachel Roos-Hertz. In July 1942, Marcel's family was called up for forced work in the East. They, including Rachel and her mother, were invited by Martha Nagtegaal a former employee of the Hertz family, to be hidden by different parts of the Nagtegaal family. In March 1943 Martha obtained forged identity documents and ration stamps for them. From that time, 1943–1945, Rachel was involved in the Dutch Resistance, and so was her fiancé, Marcel, who went by the fictitious name of Rienus van Elck.

On 9 May 1945, Rachel and Moshe married in a civil ceremony at City Hall in Ede; in August 1945 they married in a Jewish ceremony in Utrecht. Rachel gave birth to their first son in April 1946. In September, the family moved to Rotterdam, where Moshe got a job and a residence permit.

== Resistance ==
Pretending to be a Christian farmer, Rachel joined the Dutch Resistance as a courier of Bill Wildeboer, the leader of the resistance in the Ederveen – Bennekom region. In May 1943, they merged also with the branch of Lunteren. Rachel was involved in hiding Jews and Dutch conscientious objectors. In August 1944, the existing national organizations merged into the internal forces under the command of Prince Bernhard. Rachel was involved in the sabotage of Germans' orders and in reaching and assisting the Battle of Arnhem's Allied Forces. On November 17, Rachel was arrested by the Germans. She managed to destroy her commander's letters before they were found by the wardens. While trying to escape she was shot and brought back to the main headquarters of the Sicherheitsdienst, the German Security Forces. There she was severely tortured, but never disclosed the names of her comrades. Since her Jewish origin was not known, and her membership in the underground could not be proven, she was not executed. Three months later, as the Allies got closer to the Netherlands, she was transferred to the Westerbork transit camp, and from there she was sent to the death march, from which she escaped. She hid on a farm for two days until the Netherlands was freed. She moved to Lunteren where she met her fiancé, Moshe Hertz, and later on - her mother.

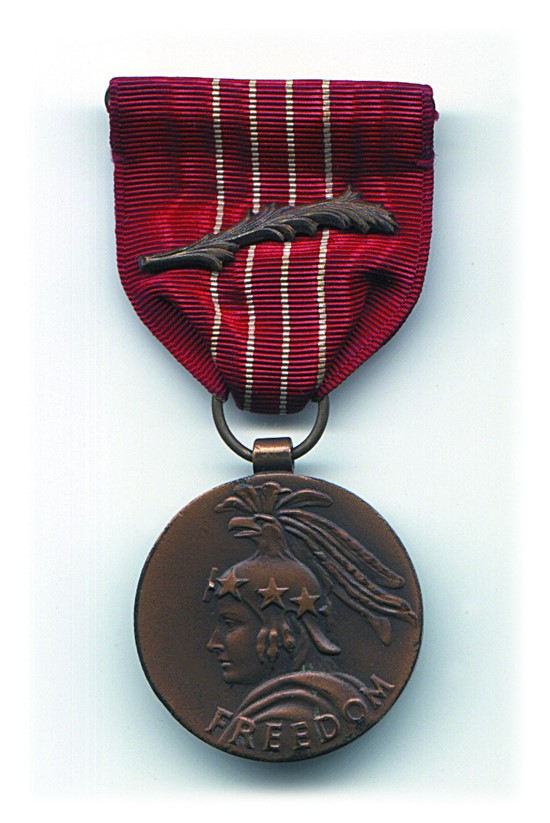
Rachel Harel's Medal of Freedom

== Awards ==
On 21 November 1946, in a ceremony at the Tropenmuseum Amsterdam, Rachel was awarded the United States Medal of Freedom. On 18 October 1948 in the British Embassy in The Hague, she was awarded the United Kingdom King's Medal for Courage in the Cause of Freedom.

A street in Ede, Netherlands is named Didi Rooslaan ("Didi Roos Lane") in her honor, as are neighboring streets honoring Janny Laupman, Piet Rombout, and Henk Wildenburg, other participants in the Dutch Resistance in Ede.

== Israel ==
In February 1950, Rachel, Moshe and their two children immigrated to Israel and lived for a while in Kibbutz Beit HaShita. Later, they moved to Holon, where their third son was born in 1954. In 1956, Rachel joined the Women's International Zionist Organization (Wizo). In 1980, after they moved to Herzliya, she was elected as the chairwoman of the local branch. She was also active in Rotary and in fund raising for sick children.

Rachel died in 1989, after returning home from a ceremony at Yad Vashem in the Netherlands, in which the Nagtegaal family was recognized as Righteous among the Nations.
