= Ina Boekbinder =

Catharina Drukker-Boekbinder
- Born: Catharina Aaltjen Boekbinder; 5 September 1915; Assen, Drenthe, Netherlands
- Died: 13 December 1987 (aged 72); Hilversum, North Holland, Netherlands
- Other names: Ina (nickname), Catharina Weesing (resistance alias)
- Occupation: Dutch Resistance Member
- Parent(s): Lambertus Lodewijk Boekbinder, Rosina Levie
- Relatives: Betje Catharina Boekbinder
- Awards: Verzetsherdenkingskruis (Resistance Memorial Cross)

Catharina Aaltjen Boekbinder (5 September 1915 – 13 December 1987) was a member of the Dutch Resistance during World War II. Known to family and friends as "Ina Boekbinder," she used the alias, "Catharina Weesing," during her resistance work. In 1981, she was awarded the Verzetsherdenkingskruis (Resistance Memorial Cross) by the Dutch government for her work as a freedom fighter and for her efforts to protect Jewish men, women and children in the Netherlands from persecution and deportation by Nazi officials.

== Formative years ==
Born on 5 September 1915 in Assen, in the province of Drenthe, Netherlands, Ina Boekbinder was the youngest daughter of Rosina (Levie) Boekbinder (1884–1969), a native of Leek, and Lambertus Lodewijk Boekbinder (1884–1937), a native of Borger who operated a textile firm from Gedempte Singel in Assen.

She and her sister, Betje Catharina (1912-1991) grew up in Assen. During the 1920s, they were enrolled at School 1 in Assen (later known as Noordersingelschool). Ina Boekbinder's image was captured in two school photographs, one of her fourth grade class, which was taken circa 1924, and in the second with her mother and classmates during a school field trip sometime between 1926 and 1930.

After completing her education at the community school, she pursued nursing training at the Wilhelmina Ziekenhuis Assen (the Wilhelmina Hospital in Assen.

In 1937, Lambertus Boekbinder died. Three years later, Ina Boekbinder became Ina Boekbinder-Horn in Amsterdam on 30 October 1940 when she married Leopold Silvain ("Leo") Horn Jr. (1916–1995), a textile worker and soccer referee.

== World War II ==
Following the invasion and occupation of the Netherlands by Germany in May 1940, Ina Horn and her husband, joined the Dutch Resistance, and went into hiding as part of the underground movement. During this time, her widowed mother and sister were also forced to go into hiding, finding security at Assen's Gedempte Singel, where the Boekbinder family patriarch had previously operated his textile business.

Operating as "Catharina Weesing," an alias supported by forged identity papers, Ina was employed as a nurse at the Wester (Wilhelmina) Gasthuis while also working for the Amsterdam Resistance from a safehouse at the Nicolaas Witsenkade 9. Her husband, Leo Horn, also performed resistance work under his own alias; this work, however, ultimately required the couple to separate. A

Meanwhile, Ina took on increasingly dangerous tasks for her resistance cell. Transporting sten guns (submachine guns) via pannier bags to fellow resistance fighters across Amsterdam as "Catharina Weesing," she also helped to rob a bandage depot at Amsterdam's Ringdijk, from which she stole bandages and other supplies and then used a hearse to transport those items to resistance supporters. She also procured food and food ration cards for Jewish men and women, and transported Jewish children to the homes of non-Jewish families in order to prevent their persecution and deportation by Dutch and German police.

While engaged in a food delivery trip between Apeldoorn and Zutphen in early 1945, she was wounded severely enough that she was forced to use crutches for the remainder of the war.

== Post-war life ==
After war's end, Ina and her husband, Leo Horn, decided to end their marriage. Their divorce was finalized on 31 October 1945.

She then remarried in 1951, becoming Catharina Aaltjen Drukker-Boekbinder, and greeted the arrival of a son with her second husband.

A modest woman, she spoke little of her work with the Dutch Resistance until she was interviewed by Nico Scheepmaker for an article in the Dutch newspaper, De Gooi-en Eemlander, regarding Marga Minco's book, "Het Bittere Kruid" ("The Bitter Herb").

Ina Drukker-Boekbinder's mother and sister both also survived the war.

In 2018, her son was involved in Assen's annual World War II remembrance day ceremonies, the theme of which was, "Verzetsverhalen" ("Resistance Stories"). According to a pre-event announcement by the newspaper, Asser Courant, the 4 May 2018 schedule was slated to include a performance in which he told the 'fairy tale' of three nieces from Assen. His mother Ina Boekbinder plays a role in this story in her own way."

== Death and burial ==
Catharina ("Ina") Drukker-Boekbinder died on 13 December 1987 in Hilversum in the province of North Holland, Netherlands.

== Awards ==
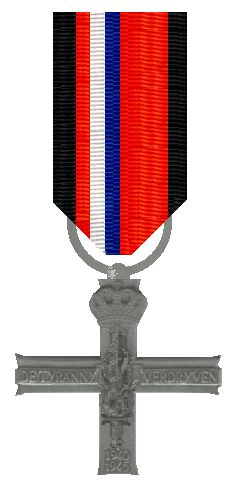

In 1981, Ina Boekbinder was awarded the Verzetsherdenkingskruis (Resistance Memorial Cross) by the Dutch government for her work with the Dutch Resistance.

According to Erik Müller, who has been researching and writing about Dutch medals for the Orders and Medals Research Society, "the cross was awarded to members of the Dutch Underground Movement for active resistance to the enemy," and is inscribed with the words, "De Tyrannie Verdryven" ("To get rid of tyranny").

The photograph (at right in this section) is a general image, provided here to illustrate what Gerritsen's Resistance Memorial Cross would have looked like.

== External resources ==
- "Amsterdam," in "Holocaust Encyclopedia." Washington, D.C.: United States Holocaust Memorial Museum.
- Lagrou, Peter. The legacy of Nazi occupation: patriotic memory and national recovery in Western Europe, 1945-1965, pp. 74–77. Cambridge: Cambridge University Press, 2000 ISBN 0-521-65180-8).
- "The Netherlands: Historical Background." Jerusalem, Israel: Yad Vashem.
