= Susan Buchbinder =

American physician

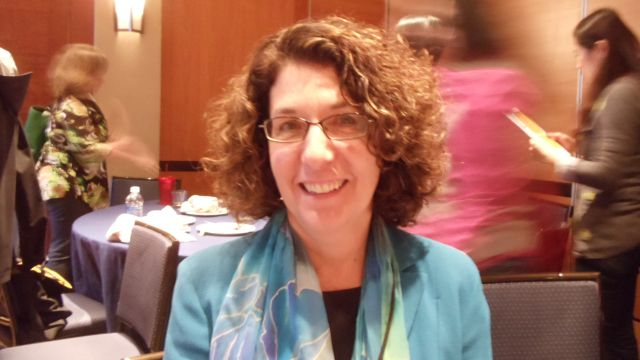
- Buchbinder in 2011

Academic background
- Education: Brown University, University of California San Francisco

Susan Buchbinder (born 1959) is an American physician who is best known for her work in HIV prevention and as a researcher in the HIV Vaccine Trials Network. In 2011, she was elected a fellow of the American Association for the Advancement of Science. She is Clinical Professor of Medicine, Epidemiology and Biostatistics at the University of California, San Francisco.

== Early life and education ==
Buchbinder graduated from Brown University and UCSF School of Medicine. Her residency in general primary care was at San Francisco General Hospital.

== Professional history ==
Buchbinder serves as the research director on HIV for the San Francisco Department of Public Health. She is on the HIV and AIDS editorial board of Medscape.

Buchbinder was an investigator in the iPrEx study.
