= Ingeborg Kahlenberg =

Dutch resistance fighter and photographer (1920–1996)

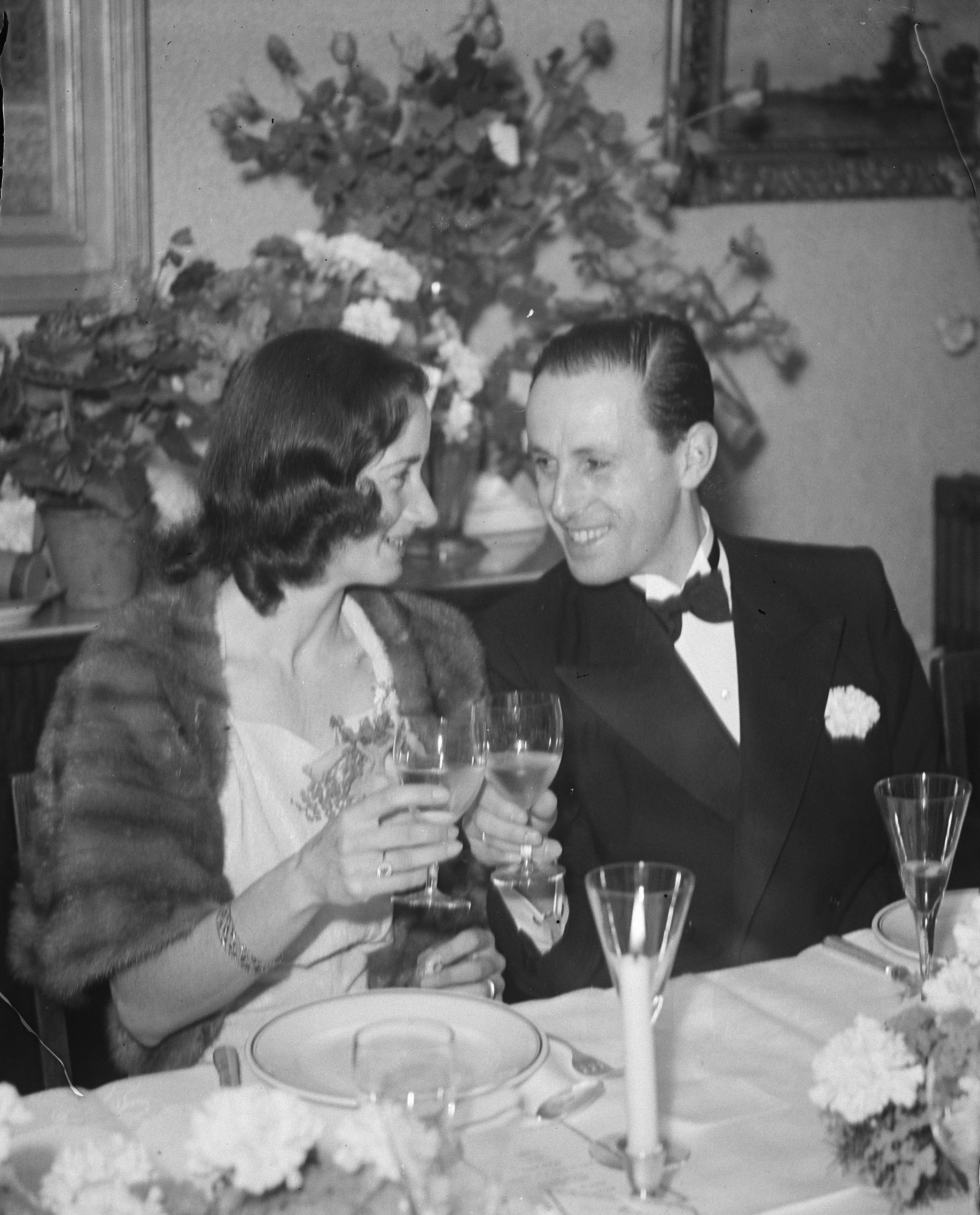
- Ingeborg Wallheimer and Fritz Kahlenberg, 1946
- Born: Ingeborg Wallheimer; March 27, 1920; Bremen
- Died: October 2, 1996 (aged 76); New York City
- Citizenship: German, American
- Occupations: Photographer, film producer
- Years active: 1944–1996
- Known for: Resistance photography during World War II
- Spouse: Fritz Kahlenberg

Ingeborg Luise Wallheimer Kahlenberg (Bremen, March 27, 1920 – New York, October 2, 1996) was a German-born photographer and member of the Dutch resistance during the Second World War. She was awarded the Resistance Memorial Cross (VHK), by Royal Dutch decree.

Ingeborg Wallheimer was born in Bremen in 1920 and moved to Amsterdam with her family in 1939. She met Fritz Kahlenberg, who taught her photography, while working for the Dutch Resistance They were both photographers for the resistance group De Ondergedoken Camera ("the Underground or Hidden Camera"). The group filmed and photographed German activities and the famine and privations suffered by the Dutch, beginning in November 1944. It operated covertly, in violation of Nazi restrictions against photography outside domestic spaces in the Netherlands. Photographs taken by Ingeborg Wallheimer and Fritz Kahlenberg were instrumental in convincing the Red Cross to make food drops in Holland.

In addition to photography, Wallheimer's resistance activities included illegal communications, transporting armaments, and forgery. Kahlenberg and Wallheimer married in 1946 and emigrated to the United States in 1949. They founded a film production company, Film Authors, Inc., which produced documentaries.

The Jewish Museum in New York City featured an exhibition of work by members of the Hidden Camera group entitled ''The Illegal Camera: Photography in the Netherlands During the German Occupation, 1940–1945'' in 1996. The Kahlenbergs died within two weeks of one another in October 1996, while the exhibition was on view.
