= David Buchbinder (academic) =

Australian professor

- Born: 1947 (age 78–79); Mombasa, Kenya

Academic background
- Education: Cornell University
- Thesis: A critical old-spelling edition of The tragedy of Sir John Van Olden Barnavelt (1974)

Academic work
- Institutions: Curtin University and University of Western Australia
- Main interests: English and cultural studies, masculinities studies
- Notable works: Studying Men and Masculinities (2013)
- Website: dbuchbin.me

David Buchbinder (born 1947) is professor of Masculinities Studies at Curtin University in Perth, Western Australia, and adjunct professor of English and Cultural Studies at the University of Western Australia.

== Education ==
Buchbinder gained his doctorate in English literature from Cornell University in 1974, his thesis was based on an old-spelling edition of the Jacobean play, The Tragedy of Sir John van Olden Barnavelt.

== Bibliography ==
=== Books ===
- Buchbinder, David (1991). Contemporary literary theory and the reading of poetry. South Melbourne: Macmillan. ISBN 978-0-333-57024-1. With a chapter on poetry and gender by Barbara H. Milech.
- Buchbinder, David; Milech, Barbara H.; Dibble, Brian (1992). A directory of women's studies in Australian. Nepean, Kingswood, NSW: University of Western Sydney. OCLC 320876233.
- Buchbinder, David (1994). Masculinities and identities. Interpretations Series. Carlton, Victoria Portland, Oregon: Melbourne University Press. ISBN 978-0-522-84545-7.

- Buchbinder, David (2004). Sii uomo!: studio sulle identità maschili (in Italian). Gasparo Magnifico (translator) Susan Petrilli (editor). Milano: Mimesis. ISBN 978-88-8483-216-0.

- Buchbinder, David (1998). Performance anxieties: re-producing masculinity. St. Leonards, NSW., Australia: Allen & Unwin. ISBN 978-1-86448-425-0.
- Buchbinder, David (2013). Studying men and masculinities. Abingdon, Oxon New York: Routledge. ISBN 978-0-203-85222-4.

Editor

- Buchbinder, David, ed. (2002). Start trek and endgame: millenial politics, narratives, images: a selection of papers from the Australian and South Pacific Association for Comparative Literature Studies Conference, Fremantle Western Australia, 11-13 December 1997. Bentley, Western Australia: Black Swan Press. OCLC 223696714.
- Buchbinder, David, ed. (2003). Essays in masculinities studies 2002. Bentley, Western Australia: Black Swan Press. ISBN 978-1-74067-289-4.
