= Bookbinder (disambiguation) =

A bookbinder is someone who binds books.

Bookbinder may also refer to:

- Alan Bookbinder (born 1956), British journalist and Master of Downing College, Cambridge
- Elaine Bookbinder (born 1945), singer better known as Elkie Brooks
- Roy Bookbinder (born 1943), American guitarist and singer
- Hyman Bookbinder, former leader of the American Jewish Committee

== See also ==
- Old Original Bookbinder's, a restaurant
- Buchbinder, a German surname
