= Jack Ooms =

Dutch chemist and diplomat

Arie Jacobus Johannes "Jack" Ooms (1925 - 6 September 1999, Spain) was a Dutch chemist, diplomat and chemical weapons researcher. As head of Dutch chemical defence research, Ooms worked for 23 years for the eradication of chemical warfare, which he believed could best be achieved by a combination of effective chemical protection and international chemical arms control and a permanent, multilateral ban on chemical weapons, as implementation of the Chemical Weapons Convention.

== Education ==
In 1942, during the German occupation of the Netherlands, Ooms entered the University of Utrecht to study chemistry. The following year, he refused to sign the Nazi loyalty declaration and became an Engelandvaarder by escaping to the United Kingdom through Spain and Portugal, much of it on foot. He joined the United States Army and in August 1944 returned to mainland Europe with the Allies in southern France. After the war, in 1948, he finished his MSc and was subsequently conscripted into the Netherlands Army for his three years of required national service. His doctoral dissertation, which he successfully defended in 1961 at the University of Leiden, was called "Reactivity of Organic Phosphorus Compounds towards Certain Esterases."

== Career ==
While carrying out his national service, Ooms joined the National Defence Research Organization's (RVO-TNO) new Chemical Laboratory. He was appointed director in 1965 and retained this position in 1978 when the lab merged with the organisation's Technological Laboratory. It was renamed the TNO Prins Maurits Laboratory. He remained in his role until his retirement in 1988. In 1990, he was a founding member of the advisory board of the Harvard Sussex Program on Chemical and Biological Weapons.

Ooms’ active participation in the negotiation of a permanent, multilateral ban on chemical weapons, began in 1969 when he joined the Netherlands' delegation to the Eighteen Nation Committee on Disarmament (ENCD) in Geneva as a technical adviser. The ENCD (1962-1969) was one of several predecessors to the Conference on Disarmament (CD). Ooms became the only CD delegate that continuously participated over the full 20 years of negotiations, which culminated in the adoption of the Chemical Weapons Convention by the United Nations General Assembly in 1992. He attended the 1980 International School of Disarmament and Research on Conflicts and later served on the Dutch delegation to the preparatory commission that founded the Organisation for the Prohibition of Chemical Weapons with its headquarters in The Hague. In 1991, Ooms was appointed to the United Nations Special Commission, at that time forming to oversee Iraq's renunciation of weapons of mass destruction. This work continued to engage him in the months immediately prior to his death in 1999.

== Personal life and legacy ==
Ooms died on 6 September 1999 at his home in Spain and was survived by his wife Marjan.

One of the main conference rooms used by the Organisation for the Prohibition of Chemical Weapons in The Hague is called the Ooms Room to commemorate his efforts. On 27 April 2006, Prime Minister Jan-Peter Balkenende unveiled a photograph of Ooms during his visit on the first observance of the Day of Remembrance for All Victims of Chemical Warfare.
