= Allied Subjects' Medal =

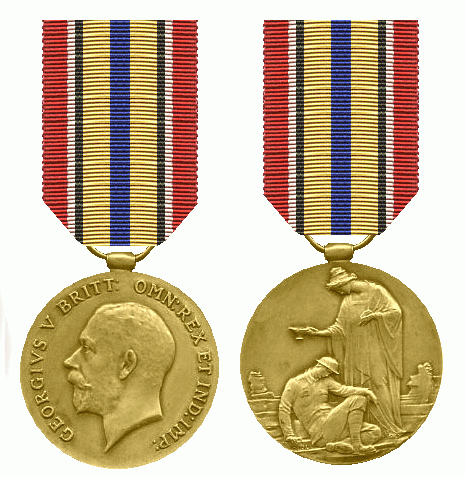
- Obverse and reverse of medal
- Awarded for: Helping British servicemen behind enemy lines
- Description: Circular, 36 mm (1.4 in) in diameter
- Presented by: United Kingdom of Great Britain and Ireland
- Eligibility: Civilians of allied and neutral countries
- Campaign(s): World War I
- Established: 1920, distributed 1922
- Total: 134 in silver and 574 in bronze
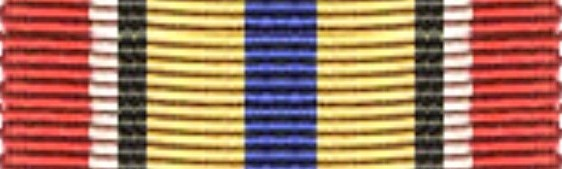
- Ribbon, 25 mm (1 inch) wide

The Allied Subjects' Medal was a British decoration, distributed by the Foreign Office, to citizens of allied and neutral countries who gave assistance to British and Commonwealth soldiers, mainly escaped prisoners of war, behind enemy lines between 1914–1918. Originally instituted in 1920, delays caused by discussions within Government on the precise form and design of the award meant that it was only manufactured and distributed in 1922.

The medal was awarded in silver and bronze, most to Belgian and French citizens, although Danish, Dutch and other nationals also received the award. In total, 134 silver and 574 in bronze medals were awarded, nearly half (56 silver and 247 bronze) to women. In addition, 28 further foreign nationals who had rendered notable assistance received honorary appointments to the Order of the British Empire, while about one thousand others received letters of thanks for their services.

Both the silver and bronze medals are 36 millimetres (1.4 in) in diameter and of the same design. The obverse bears the left facing bare headed effigy of King George V with the inscription "GEORGIVS V BRITT: OMN: REX ET IND: IMP:". The reverse shows a female allegory of Humanity offering a cup to a British soldier resting on the ground, with ruined buildings in the background. It was awarded unnamed.

The design of the medal was by sculptor Charles Doman.

The medal has a ring suspension. The 25 millimetres (1.0 in) wide ribbon, which incorporates the French and Belgian national colours, is red with a light blue centre, flanked by stripes of yellow black and white.

In France and Belgium, it was generally referred to as Médaille de la Reconnaissance britannique or Médaille de la Reconnaissance anglaise, after the Médaille de la Reconnaissance française.

In the Second World War the King's Medal for Courage in the Cause of Freedom took its place.
