= War Commemorative Cross =

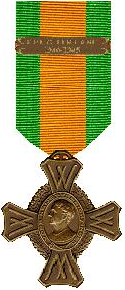
- Obverse of the War Commemorative Cross
- Type: Military campaign decoration
- Awarded for: Service during the war in specified locations, time periods, or character of service.
- Presented by: the Kingdom of the Netherlands
- Campaign: World War II
- Status: No longer awarded
- Established: 16 March 1944
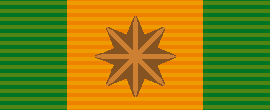
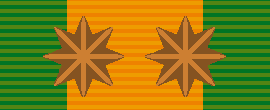
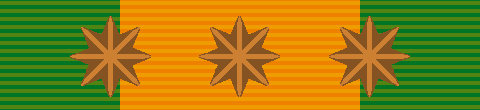
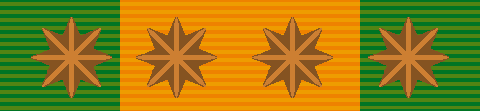
- Undress Ribbon for one clasp Undress Ribbon for two clasps Undress Ribbon for three clasps Undress Ribbon for four clasps

Precedence
- Next (higher): Lombok Cross
- Next (lower): Resistance Commemorative Cross

The War Commemorative Cross (Dutch: Oorlogsherinneringskruis) is a military award of the Netherlands. The medal was established to commemorate service to the Kingdom of the Netherlands during World War II. The medal was established on 16 March 1944 by royal decree of Queen Wilhelmina.

== Appearance ==
The medal is an irregular bronze cross with concave ends on the arms. The obverse bears a central portrait of Queen Wilhelmina of the Netherlands encircled by a fastened garter. On the garter are the words VOOR KRIJGSVERRICHTINGEN (FOR MILITARY OPERATIONS). The arms of the cross bear the royal monogram of Queen Wilhelmina with an oak wreath between the arms of the cross. The reverse is plain. The cross is mounted on an orange and green coloured ribbon 27 mm (1.1 in) wide.

== Clasps ==
When the cross was established in 1944, the following clasps were initially awarded:

General Military Operations

- KRIJG TER ZEE 1940-1944
- OORLOGSVLUCHTEN 1940-1944
- OORLOGSDIENST-KOOPVAARDIJ 1940-1944
- OORLOGSDIENST-VISSERIJ 1940-1944
- KRIJG TER LAND 1940-1944

Special Military Operations

- NEDERLAND MEI 1940
- NEDERLANDSCH-INDIË 1941-1942
- JAVA-ZEE 1941-1942
- NOORD-AFRIKA-ITALIË 1942-1944

In 1947, a revised royal decree was promulgated and new clasps were announced in the Official Gazette No I 6 on 6 January 1948:

General Military Operations

- KRIJG TER ZEE 1940-1945
- OORLOGSVLUCHTEN 1940-1945
- OORLOGSDIENST-KOOPVAARDIJ 1940-1945
- OORLOGSDIENST-VISSERIJ 1940-1945
- KRIJG TE LAND 1940-1945

Special Military Operations

- NEDERLAND MEI 1940
- NEDERLANDS-INDIË 1941-1942
- JAVAZEE 1941-1942
- MIDDELLANDSE ZEE 1940-1945 (replaced NOORD-AFRIKA-ITALIË 1942-1944)
- ARNHEM–NIJMEGEN–WALCHEREN 1944
- NORMANDIË 1944
- OOST-AZIË–ZUID-PACIFIC 1942-1945
