= Cross of Merit (Netherlands) =

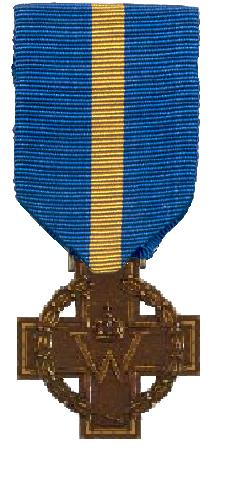
- A Cross of Merit. There are several issues and types of this decoration.
- Type: Military award
- Awarded for: Those working in the interest of the Netherlands while faced with enemy actions and distinguishing oneself through valor and resolute behavior
- Presented by: Kingdom of the Netherlands
- Status: Currently awarded
- Established: 20 February 1941

Highlights
- Total: 2,099
- Ribbon bar of the Cross of Merit

Precedence
- Next (higher): Bronze Cross
- Next (lower): Airman's Cross

On 20 February 1941, the Dutch government in exile in London instituted several new awards for bravery. The new way that wars were fought, with civilian resistance and the merchant navy in great peril, made this necessary. Amongst the new decorations was the "Cross of Merit", (Dutch: Kruis van Verdienste) an award for "working in the interest of the Netherlands while faced with enemy actions and distinguishing oneself through valor and resolute behavior". One did not have to be on the front line to win this award.

The cross has often been awarded to those who managed to flee to England and to the armed resistance. It was rarely awarded after the Korean War, but since the fighting of the Netherlands army in Afghanistan, Uruzgan, this World War II decoration has been awarded again on a regular basis with the latest on 7 October 2009 to eleven Dutch soldiers. During the World War II in the Far East this cross was awarded to several people employed by the Koninklijke Paketvaart-Maatschappij (K.P.M.) as some of their merchant navy ships had been commissioned by the Dutch Navy during the Battle of the Java Sea.

In case of repeated awards a large "2" or "3" is pinned to the ribbon.

The Cross of Merit is the fourth-highest military decoration still being awarded for bravery and has precedence after the Bronze Cross.
