= Red coat (military uniform) =

Military uniform used by British infantry since the 15th century

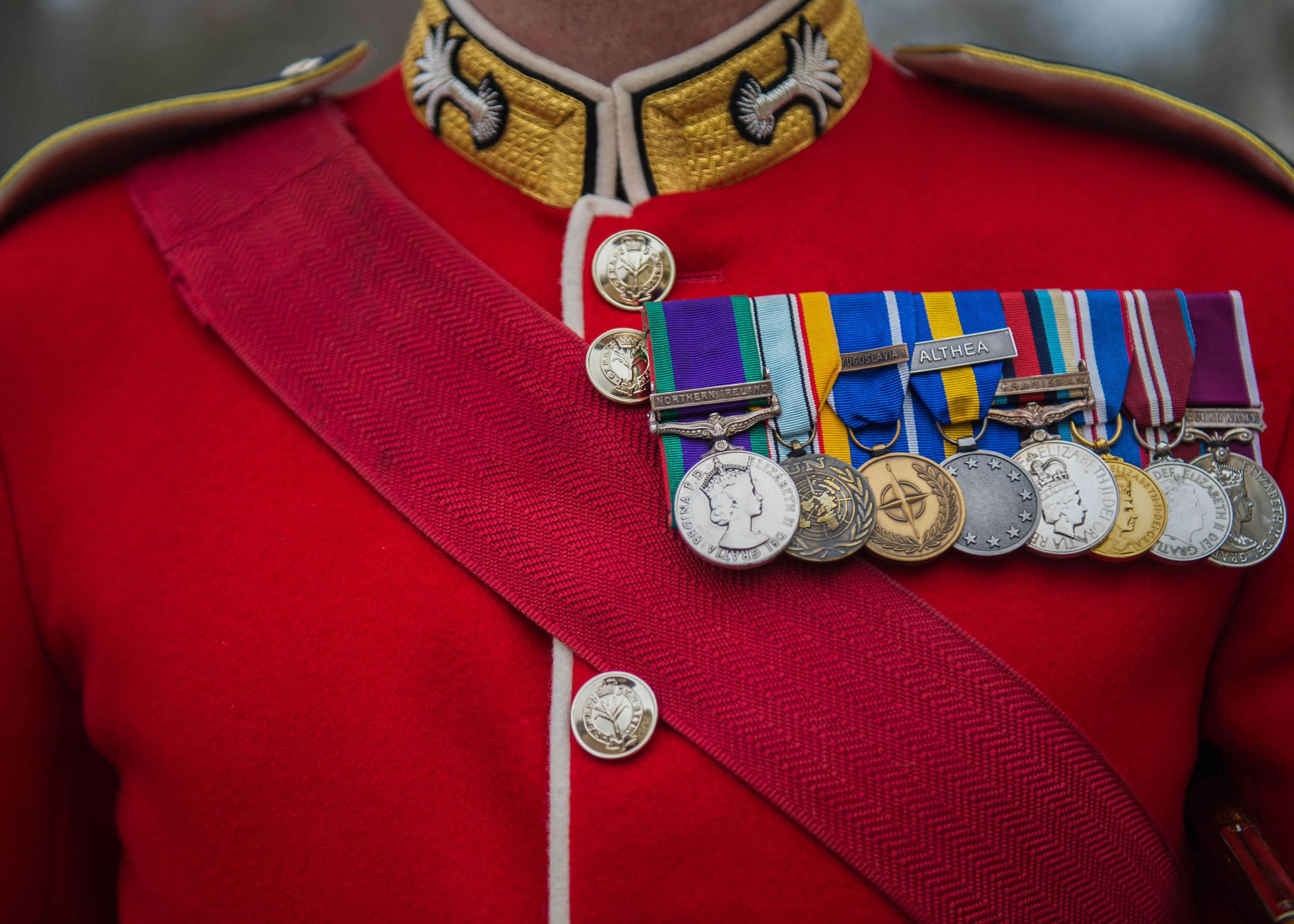
A scarlet tunic worn by a warrant officer of the Welsh Guards

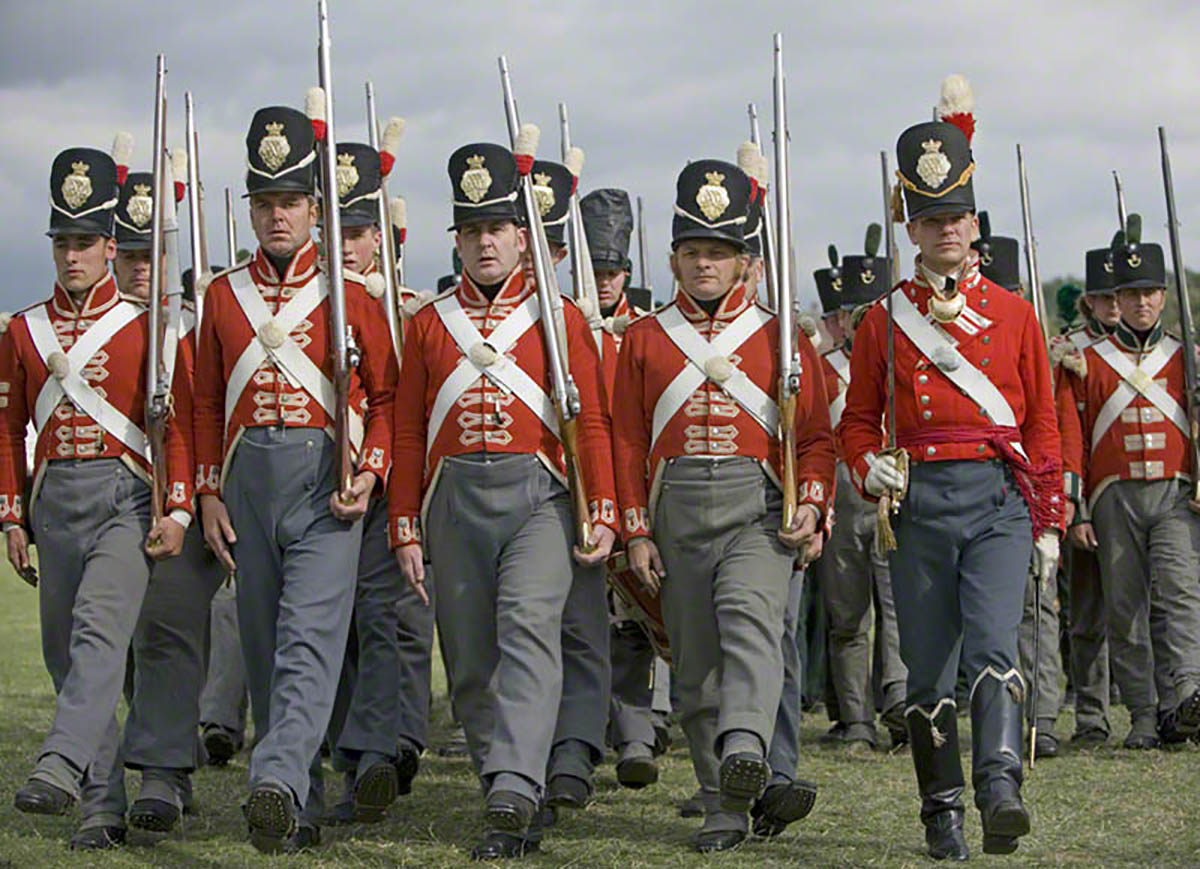
Reenactors in the red-coated uniform of the 33rd Regiment of Foot as worn during the Napoleonic Wars between 1812 and 1816. Note the brighter scarlet of the officer on the right, as well as the crimson sash around his waist.

A red coat, also referred to as a redcoat or a scarlet tunic, is a military garment formerly much used by most regiments of the British Army, so customarily that the term became a common synecdoche for the soldiers themselves.

The red coat was widely (though not exclusively) used by the infantry and some cavalry units of the British military plus the Royal Marines, from the 16th to the early 20th centuries. The garment was also widely used by the British Colonial Auxiliary Forces and the British Indian Army during the same period. Though, by the 20th century, the red coat was abandoned for practical duties in favour of khaki by all British Empire military units, it continues to be used for ceremonial full dress and mess dress uniforms in many countries of the Commonwealth of Nations.

The usage of red coats by English soldiers dates back to the Tudor period, when the Yeomen of the Guard and the Yeomen Warders were both equipped in the royal colours of the House of Tudor, red and gold. During the Tudor conquest of Ireland and the Wars of the Three Kingdoms, units of English soldiers were equipped in red coats, most notably the New Model Army, which fought on the Parliamentary side.

From the mid-17th century to the 19th century, the uniform of most British soldiers (apart from artillery, rifles and light cavalry) included a madder red coat or coatee. From 1873 onwards, the more vivid shade of scarlet was adopted for all ranks, having previously been worn only by officers, sergeants and all ranks of some cavalry regiments.

== History ==
=== Earlier instances ===
There had been instances of red military clothing pre-dating its general adoption by the New Model Army. The uniforms of the Yeomen of the Guard and the Yeomen Warders, both formed in 1485, have traditionally been in Tudor red (representing the colour of the Welsh dragon) and gold. The Gentlemen Pensioners of King James I wore red uniforms with yellow feathers in their hats. At the Battle of Edgehill, the first battle of the English Civil War, Royalist troops wore red coats, as did at least two Parliamentary regiments. However, none of these examples constituted the national uniform that the red coat was later to become.

=== 16th century ===
During the Tudor conquest of Ireland, English troops in Ireland sometimes wore red clothing, which was noted by Irish commentators. As early as 1561, a battle between English and Irish forces was being referred to as the "Battle of the Red Cassocks" (Irish: Cath na gCasóga Dearga), on the accounts of the red clothing worn by the English troops. The Irish nobleman and soldier Philip O'Sullivan Beare mentioned the battle in his 1621 history of the Tudor conquest, written during his exile in Spain. He described it as "that famous victory which is called 'of the red sagums' [illam victoriam quae dicitur 'sagorum rubrorum'] because among others who fell in battle were four hundred soldiers lately brought from England and clad in the red livery of the viceroy."

In the same work, Beare mentioned two other engagements between English and Irish forces in which the former wore red clothing. The first was an engagement in 1581 during the Second Desmond Rebellion in which according to Beare "a company of English soldiers, distinguished by their dress and arms, who were called "red sagums" [Vestibus et armis insignis erat cohors Anglorum quae "Sagorum rubrorem" nominabantur], and being sent to war [in Ireland] by the Queen were overwhelmed near Lismore by John Fitzedmund Fitzgerald, the seneschal." The second was a 1599 victory by forces under William Burke, Lord of Bealatury over "English recruits clad in red sagums" (qui erant tyrones Angli sagis rubris induti) during the Nine Years' War.

English sources confirm that some of their troops in Ireland wore red uniforms. In 1584, the Lord President of the Council informed the sheriffs and justices of the peace of Lancashire who were charged with raising 200 infantryman for service in Ireland that they should be furnished with "a cassocke of some motley, sad grene coller, or russett". In summer 1595, the Lord Deputy of Ireland William Russell, writing to William Cecil, 1st Baron Burghley about the siege of Enniskillen, mentioned that the Irish rebel leader Hugh O'Neill, Earl of Tyrone had "300 shot in red coats like English soldiers".

During the Anglo-Spanish War and Eighty Years' War, English pikemen and musketeers fighting in the Low Countries alongside the Dutch also wore red clothing. During the siege of Ostend, 1,600 English troops under the command of Sir Francis Vere, many of them wearing red clothing, arrived to the city as reinforcements in July 1601. The 16th-century military historian Julius Ferretus stated that English troops wore red uniforms to conceal blood stains, but this claim has been described as questionable by the historian Clifford Elliott Walton because blood does in fact show on red clothing as a black stain.

=== 17th century ===
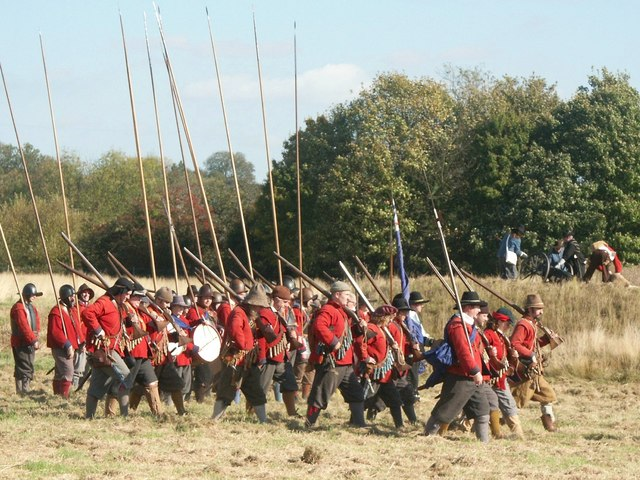
Historical reenactors depicting the New Model Army during the Battle of Winceby

The red coat evolved from being the British infantryman's normally worn uniform to a garment retained only for ceremonial purposes. Its official adoption dates from February 1645, when the Parliament of England passed the New Model Army ordinance. The new English Army was formed of 22,000 men, paper strength, comprising eleven regiments of cavalry each of 600 men for a total of 6,600, twelve regiments of infantry each of 1,200 men for a total of 14,400, and one regiment of 1,000 dragoons and the artillery, consisting of 900 men. The infantry regiments wore coats of Venetian red with white, blue or yellow facings. A contemporary comment on the New Model Army dated 7 May 1645 stated: "the men are Redcoats all, the whole army only are distinguished by the several facings of their coats."

Outside of Ireland or Britain, the English red coat made its first appearance on a European continental battlefield at the Battle of the Dunes in 1658. A Protectorate army had been landed at Calais the previous year and "every man had a new red coat and a new pair of shoes." The name of the battle comes from the major engagement carried out by the "red-coats". To the surprise of continental observers they stormed sand-dunes 150 feet (46 m) high, fighting experienced Spanish soldiers from their summits with musket fire and push of pike.

The adoption and continuing use of red by most British/English soldiers after The Restoration (1660) was the result of circumstances rather than policy, including the relative cheapness of red dyes. Another factor favouring red was that dyes of this colour were "fast" and less inclined to fade when exposed to weather. Red was by no means universal at first, with grey and blue coats also being worn.

=== 18th century ===
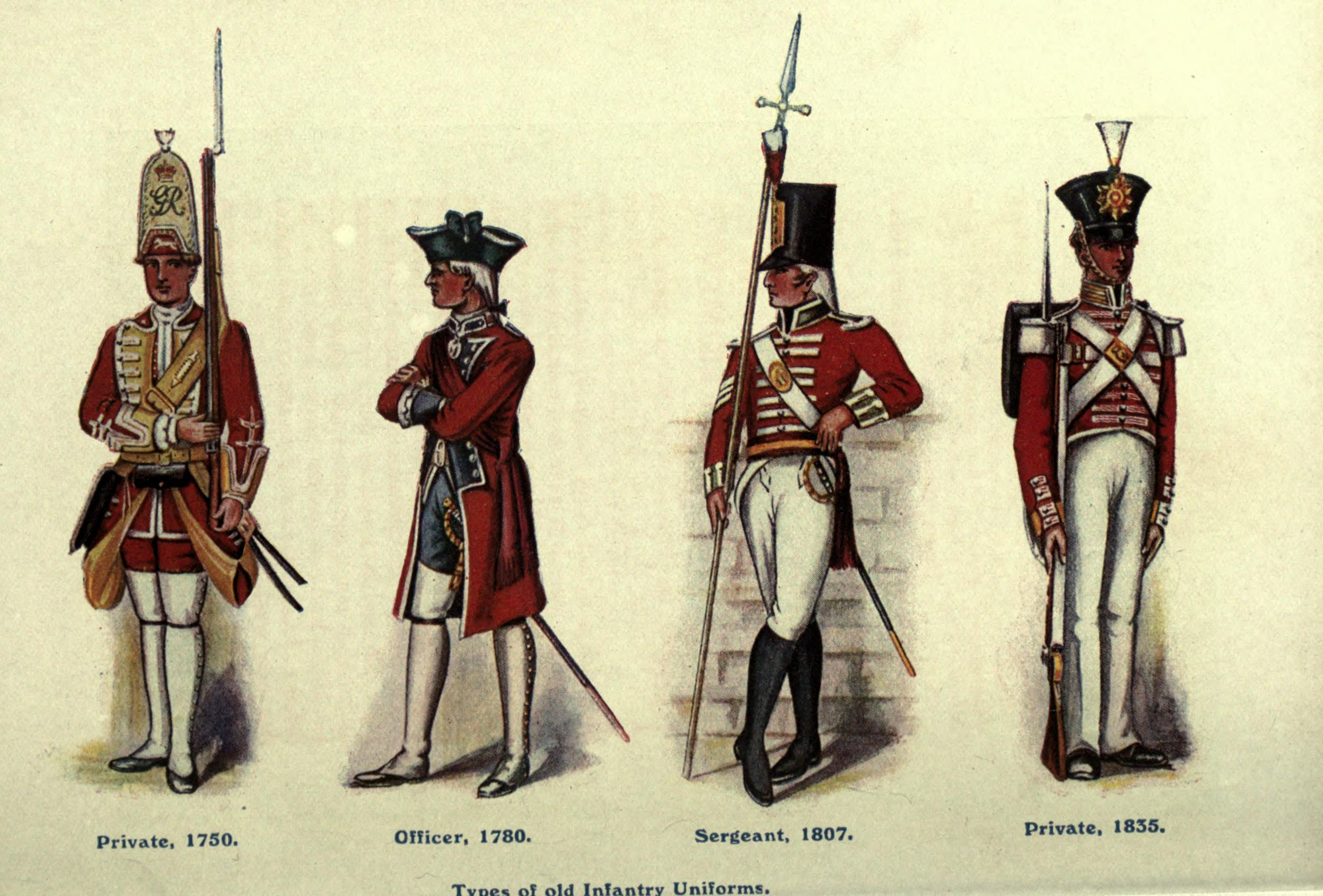
Infantry uniforms of the British Army from 1750 to 1835

Until 1784 all regular regiments of the British cavalry wore red coats, with the notable exception of The Royal Horse Guards ("The Blues"). In that year light dragoons were issued with new uniforms which included dark blue coats. Red coats were also an exclusive feature of British regular infantry until the 1802 dress regulations announced the adoption of dark green by the newly raised rifle regiments.

Prior to 1707, colonels of regiments made their own arrangements for the manufacture of uniforms under their command. This ended when a royal warrant of 16 January 1707 established a Board of General Officers to regulate the clothing of the army. Uniforms supplied were to conform to the "sealed pattern" agreed by the board. The style of the coat tended to follow those worn by other European armies. From an early stage red coats were lined with contrasting colours and turned out to provide distinctive regimental facings (lapels, cuffs and collars). Examples were blue for the 8th Regiment of Foot, green for the 5th Regiment of Foot, yellow for the 44th Regiment of Foot and buff for the 3rd Regiment of Foot.

In 1747, the first of a series of clothing regulations and royal warrants set out the various facing colours and distinctions to be borne by each regiment. The long coat worn with a white or buff-coloured waistcoat was discontinued in 1797 in favour of a tight-fitting coatee fastened with a single row of buttons, with white lace loops on either side.

==== American Revolutionary War ====
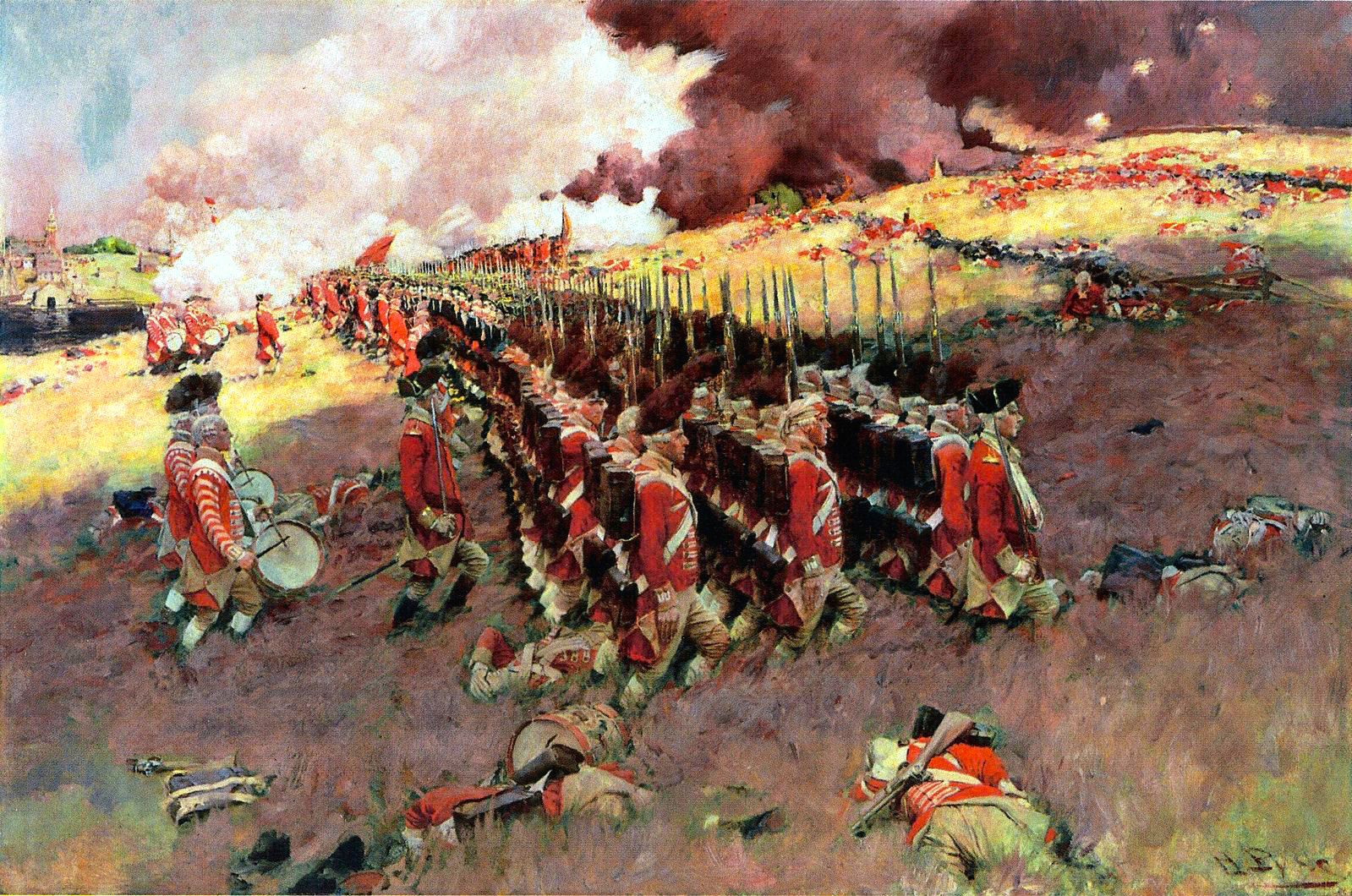
Battle of Bunker Hill, by Howard Pyle

In the United States, "Redcoat" is associated in cultural memory with the British soldiers who fought against the Patriots during the American Revolutionary War. The Library of Congress possesses several examples of the uniforms the British Army used during this time. Most soldiers who fought the Patriots wore the red coat, though all German auxiliaries and some Loyalist units had blue or green clothing.

Accounts of the time usually refer to British soldiers as "Regulars" or "the King's men". However, there is evidence of the term "red coats" being used informally, as a colloquial expression. During the Siege of Boston, on 4 January 1776, General George Washington used the term "red coats" in a letter to Joseph Reed. In an earlier letter dated 13 October 1775, Washington used a variation of the expression, stating, "whenever the Redcoat gentry pleases to step out of their Intrenchments." Major General John Stark of the Continental Army was purported to have said during the Battle of Bennington (16 August 1777), "There are your enemies, the Red Coats and the Tories. They are ours, or this night Molly Stark sleeps a widow!"

Other nicknames used by Americans to describe British regulars included "bloody backs" (in a reference to both the colour of their coats and the use of flogging as a means of punishment for military offences) and "lobsters", most notably in Boston around the time of the Boston Massacre. The earliest reference to the association with the American lobster appears in 1740, four years before the outbreak of King George's War.

=== 19th–20th century ===
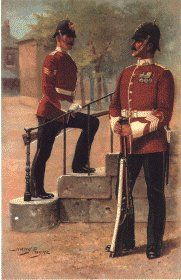
Manchester Regiment, 1913–1914. After 1902 the scarlet tunic was limited to parades and off-duty "walking out dress".

During the Napoleonic Wars (1793–1815), infantry regiments were instantly recognisable by their unique lace designs (such as "square" or "bastion" loops) paired in specific formations up the chest of the redcoat. In 1830 King William IV abolished this system of regimental lace loops, as he simplified the uniforms of the British Army.

Following the discomfort experienced by troops in the Crimean War, a more practical tunic was introduced in 1855, initially in the French double-breasted style, but replaced by a single-breasted version in the following year. An attempt at standardisation was made following the Childers Reforms of 1881, with English and Welsh regiments having white facings (collar and cuffs), Scottish yellow, Irish green and Royal regiments dark blue. However some regiments were subsequently able to obtain the reintroduction of historic facing colours that had been uniquely theirs.

British soldiers fought in scarlet and blue uniforms for the last time at the Battle of Gennis in the Sudan on 30 December 1885. They formed part of an expeditionary force sent from Britain to participate in the Nile Campaign of 1884–85, wearing the home service uniform of the period. This included scarlet "frocks" (plain jackets in harder-wearing material designed for informal wear ) as part of their active service uniform although some regiments sent from India were in khaki drill. A small detachment of infantry which reached Khartoum by steamer on 28 January 1885 were ordered to fight in their red coats in order to let the Mahdist rebels know that the real British forces had arrived.

Even after the adoption of khaki Service Dress in 1902, most British infantry regiments (81 out of 85) and some cavalry regiments (12 out of 31) continued to wear scarlet tunics on parade and for off-duty "walking out dress", until the outbreak of the First World War in 1914. While nearly all technical and support branches of the army wore dark blue, the Royal Engineers had worn red since the Peninsular War in order to draw less fire when serving amongst red-coated infantry.

Scarlet tunics ceased to be general issue upon British mobilisation in August 1914. The Brigade of Guards resumed wearing their scarlet full dress in 1920, but for the remainder of the army red coats were only authorised for wear by regimental bands and officers in mess dress or on certain limited social or ceremonial occasions (notably attendance at court functions or weddings). The reason for not generally reintroducing the distinctive full dress was primarily financial, as the scarlet cloth requires expensive cochineal dye dyed in the grain of the cloth by old-fashioned methods.

As late as 1980, consideration was given to the reintroduction of scarlet as a replacement for the dark blue "No. 1 dress" and khaki "No. 2 dress" of the modern British Army, using cheaper and fadeless chemical dyes instead of cochineal. Surveys of serving soldiers' opinion showed little support for the idea and it was shelved.

=== Colonial forces throughout the Empire ===
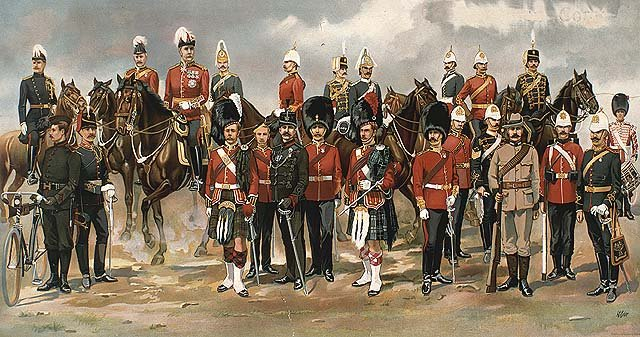
Uniforms of the Canadian Militia, 1898

Red and scarlet uniforms were widely worn by British organised or allied forces during the Imperial period. This included the presidency armies of the East India Company from 1757 onwards (along with the succeeding British Indian Army), and colonial units from Canada.

== History with the Royal Marines ==
Red coats were first worn by British sea-going regiments when adopted by the Prince of Denmark's Regiment in 1686. Thereafter red coatees became the normal parade and battle dress for marine infantry, although the staining effects of salt spray meant that white fatigue jackets and subsequently blue undress tunics were often substituted for shipboard duties. From October 1816 onwards, the Royal Marine Artillery wore the dark blue coat – faced in red with yellow bastion lace loops for gunners – of the Royal Artillery, with only buttons and badges as a distinction. The scarlet full-dress tunics of the Royal Marine Light Infantry were abolished in 1923 when the two branches of the Corps were amalgamated and dark blue became the universal uniform colour for both ceremonial and ordinary occasions. Scarlet for the Royal Marines now (2021) survives only in the mess uniform jackets of officers and senior NCOs.

== Modern use in the Commonwealth ==
The scarlet tunic has been retained as the full dress, band or mess uniforms by several armed forces of the Commonwealth of Nations. These include the Australian, British, Canadian, Fijian, Ghanaian, Indian, Jamaican, Kenyan, New Zealand, Pakistani, Singaporean, and Sri Lankan armies.

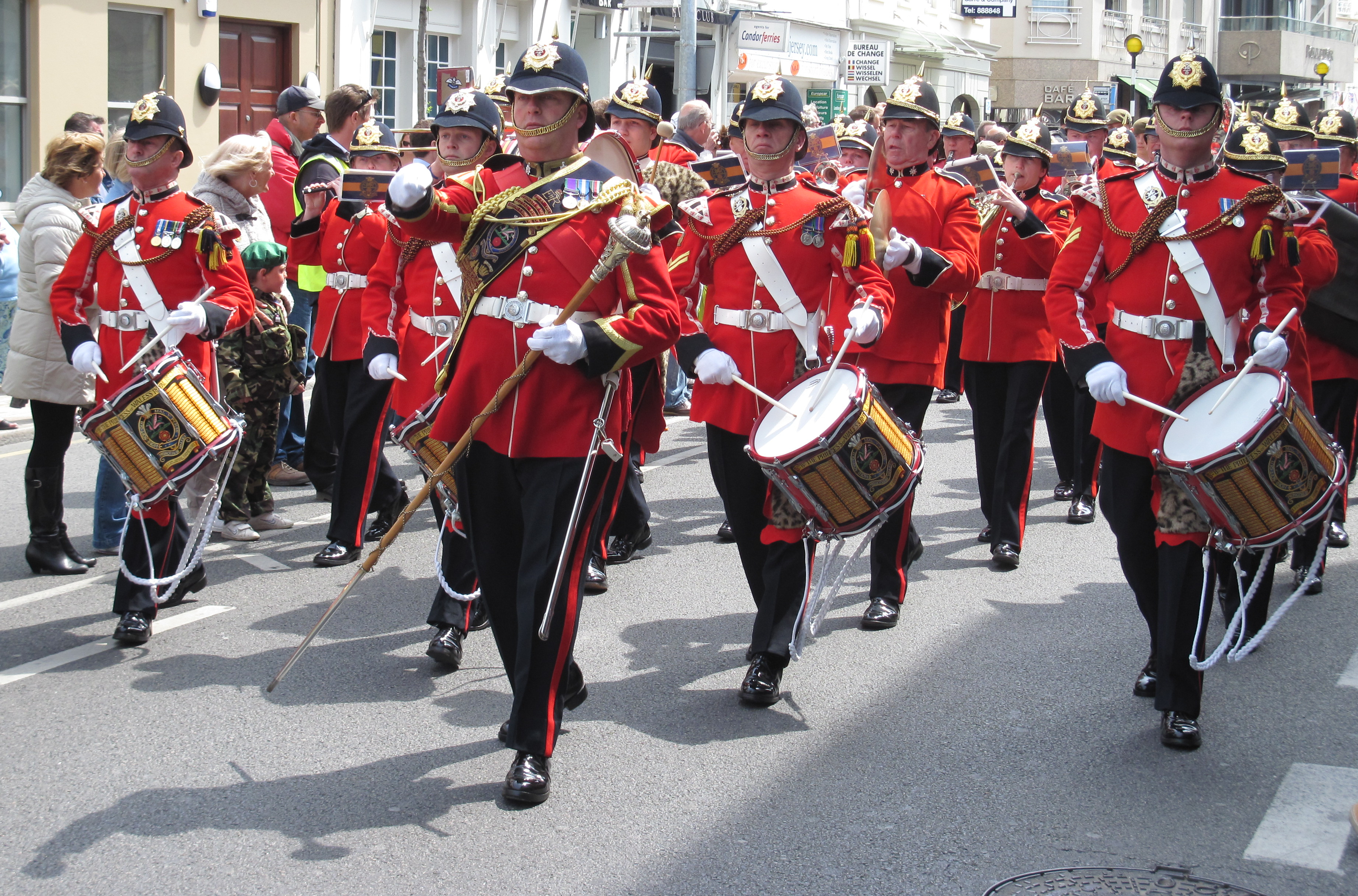
Princess of Wales's Royal Regiment of the British Army

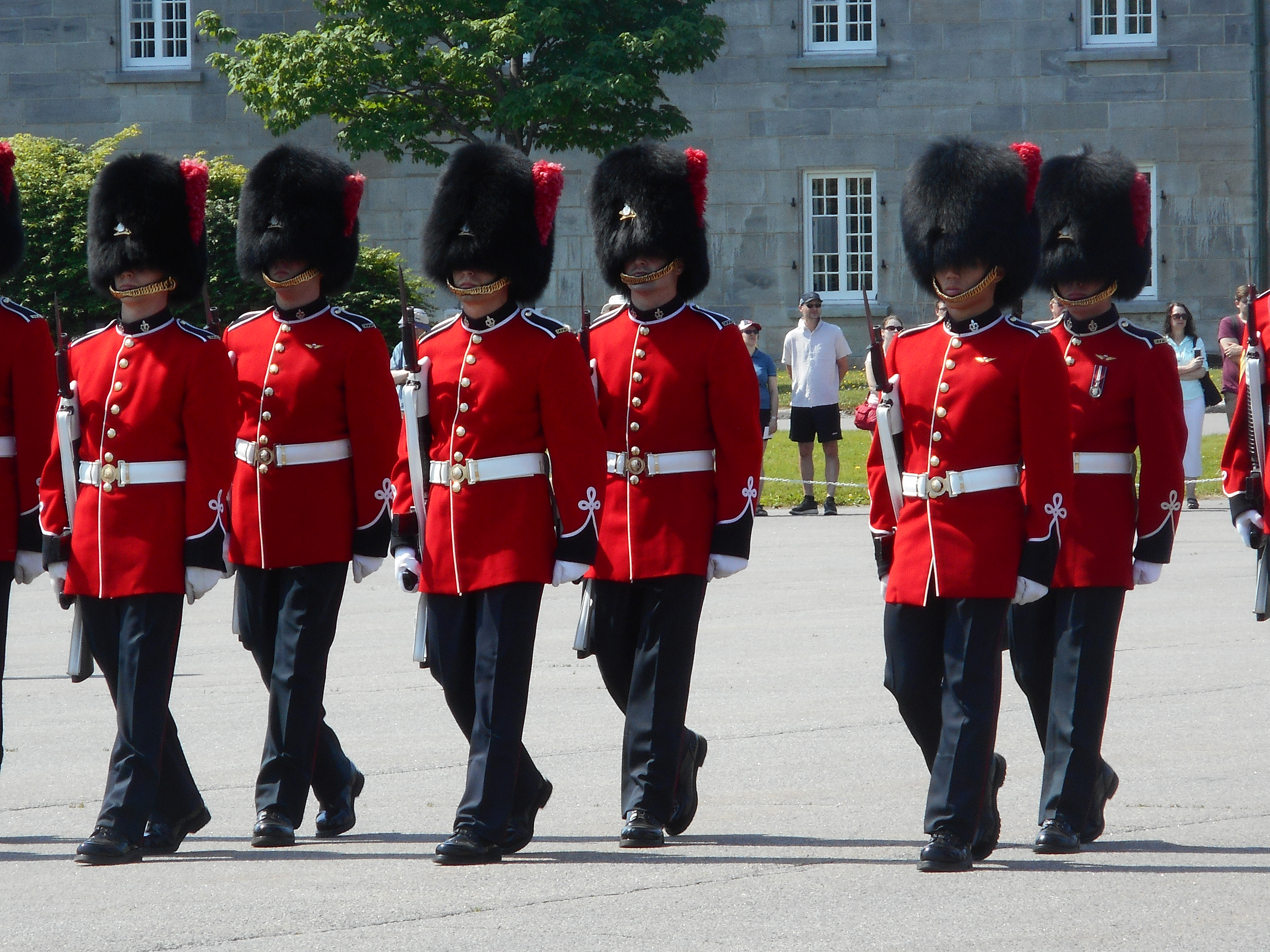
Royal 22nd Regiment of the Canadian Army

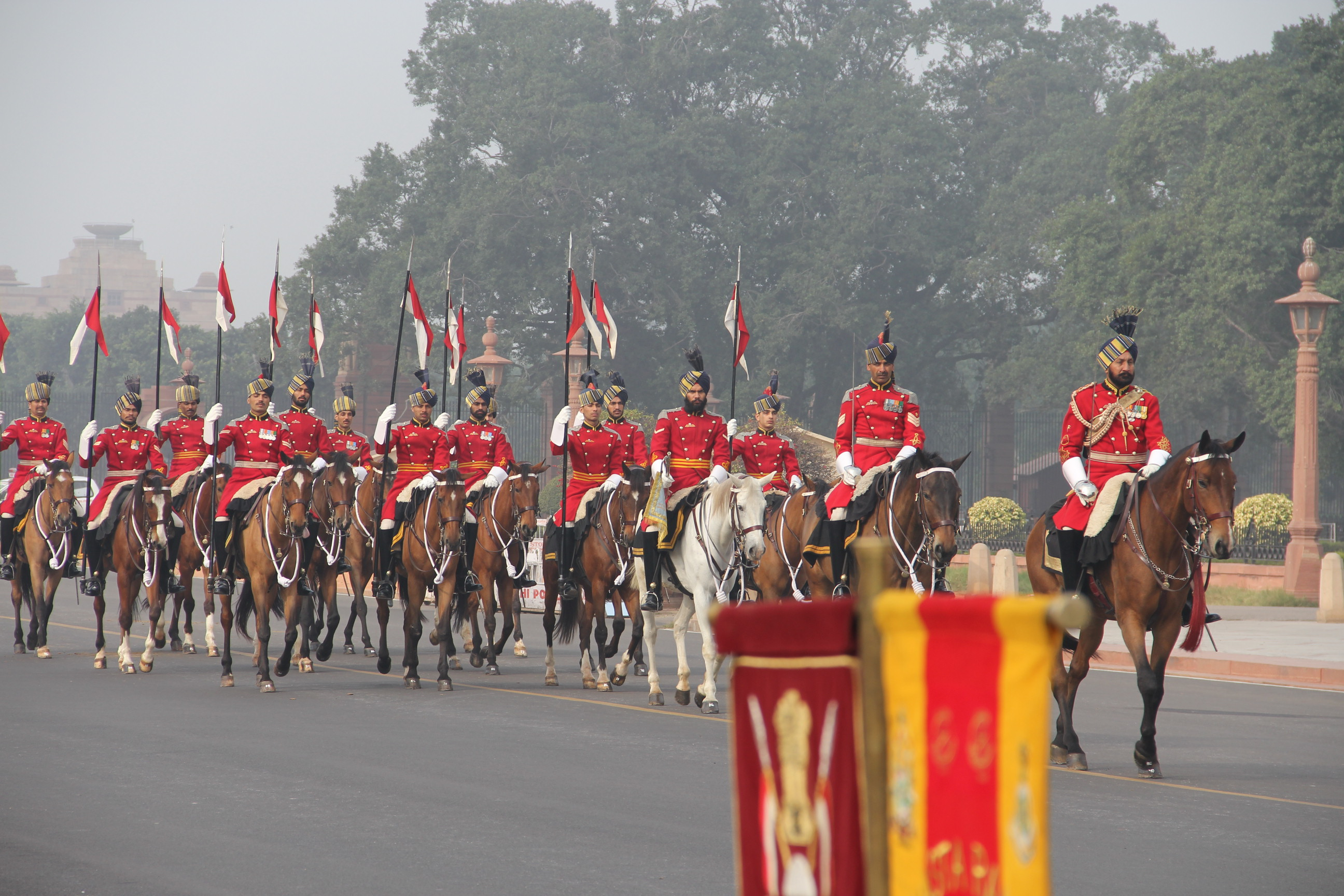
President's Bodyguard of the Indian Army

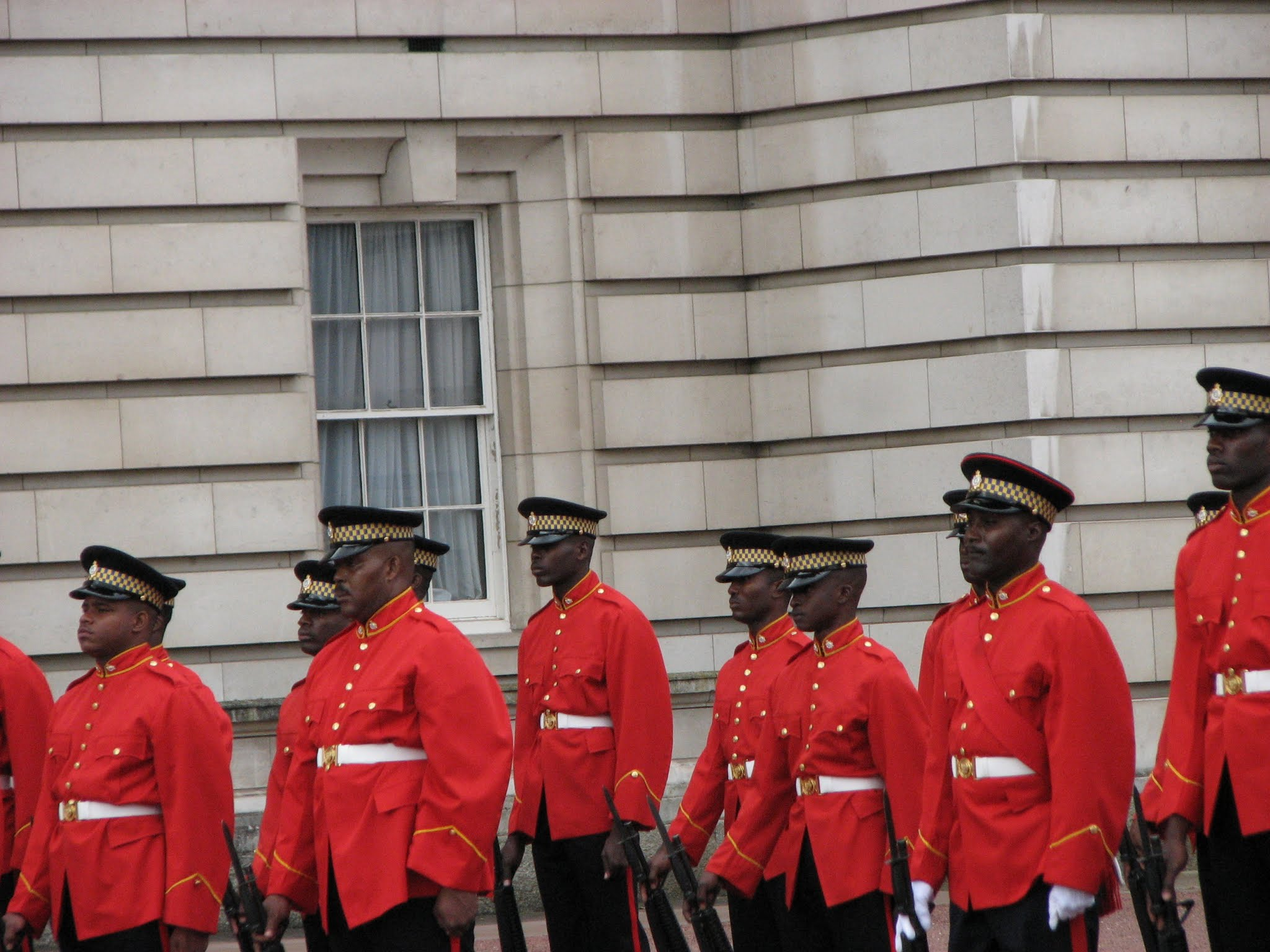
The Jamaica Regiment

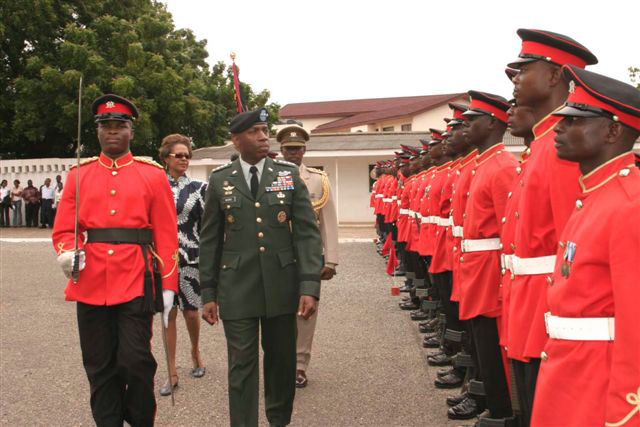
President's Own Guard Regiment of the Ghana Army

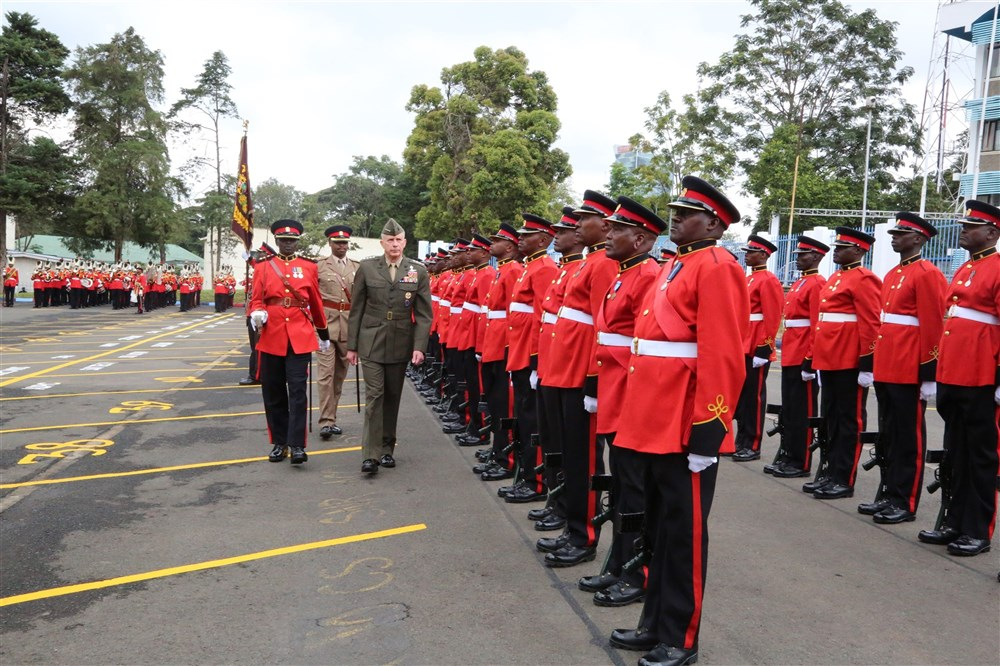
Members of the Kenyan Army

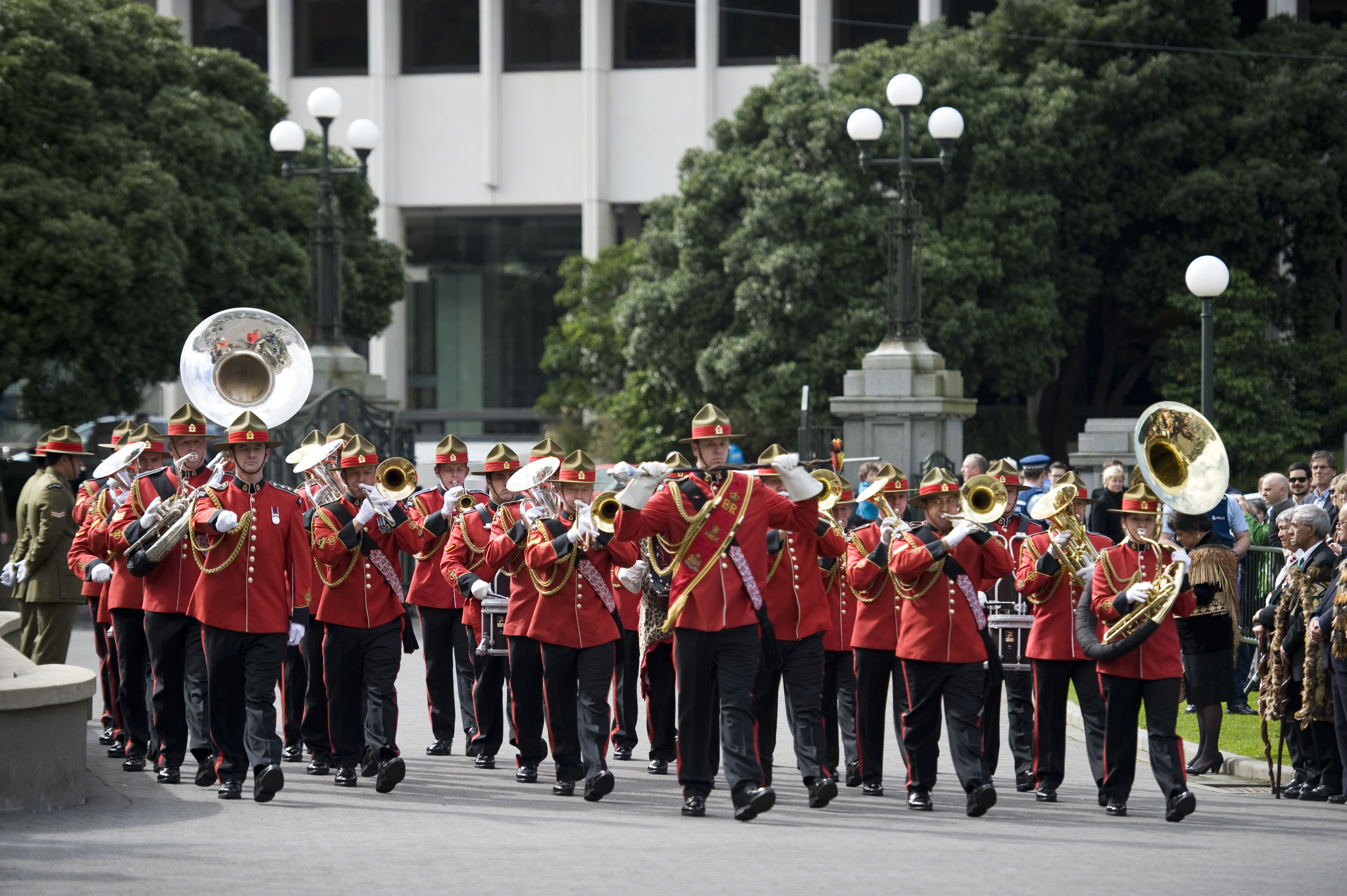
New Zealand Army Band

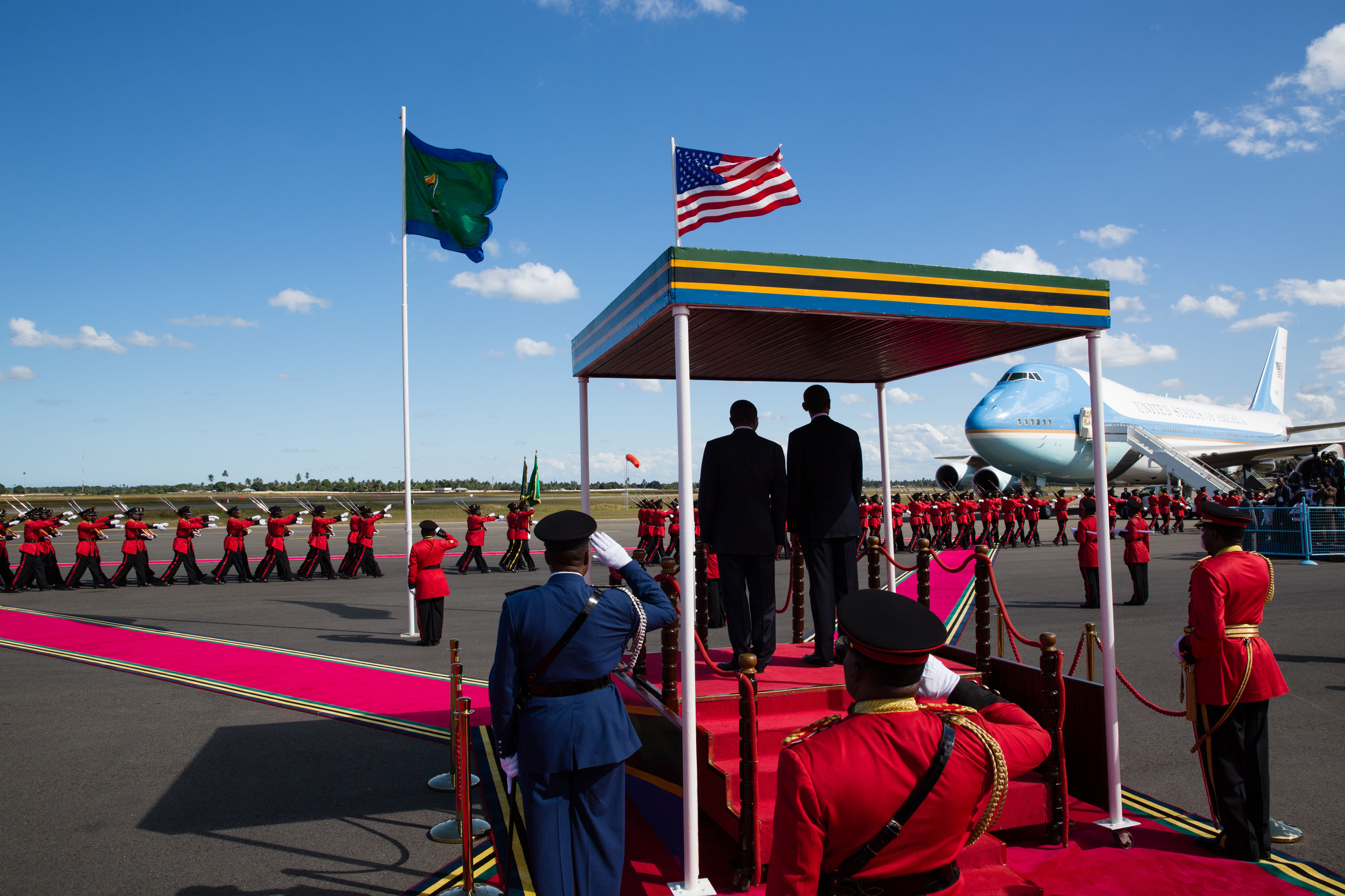
Members of the Tanzanian Army

Several Commonwealth military units continue to use a scarlet tunic as a part of their full dress uniform

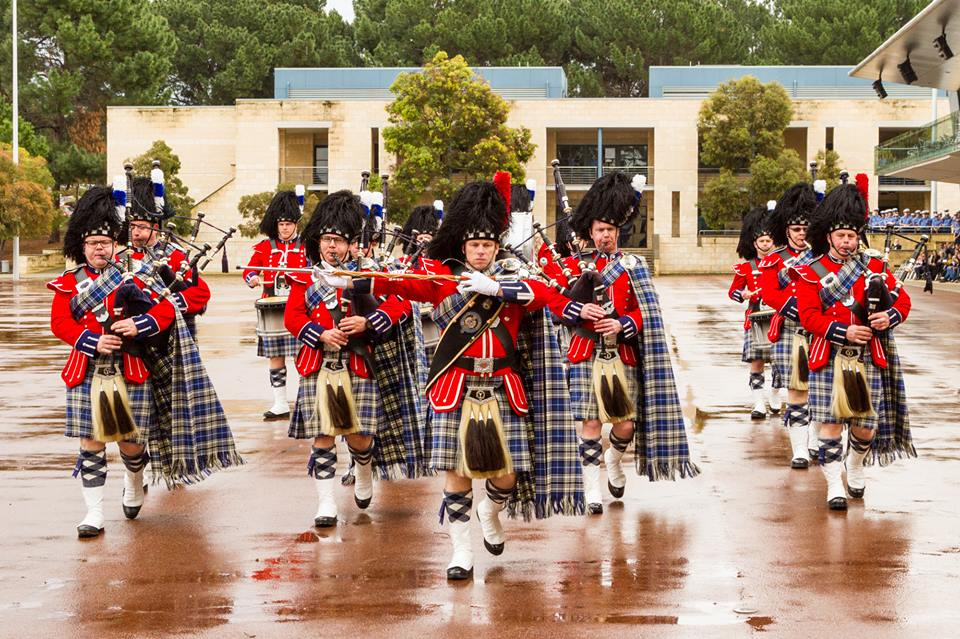
The Western Australia Police Pipe Band

=== Canada ===
Use of the scarlet tunic originates with the Canadian Militia, a militia raised to support the British Army in British North America, as well as the Canadian government following Confederation in 1867. Present dress regulations relating to the scarlet tunic originated from a simplified system ordered by the sovereign in 1902, and later promulgated in the Canadian Militia Dress Regulations 1907 and Militia Order No. 58/1908. The dress regulations, including the scarlet tunic, were maintained after the Canadian Militia was reorganized into the Canadian Army in 1940.

The Canadian Army's universal full dress uniform includes a scarlet tunic. Although scarlet is the primary colour of the tunic, its piping is white, and the unit's facing colours appear on the tunic's collar, cuffs, and shoulder straps. The universal design also features a trefoil-shaped Austrian knot embroidered atop the facing on the tunic's cuff. The variation of the scarlet tunic is also worn by cadets of the Royal Military College of Canada. However, some units in the Canadian Army are authorized regimental differences from the Army's universal full dress. As a result, some armoured regiments and artillery units substitute dark blue, Canadian-Scottish regiments "archer green", and all rifle/Voltigeur regiments "rifle green" for scarlet tunics as a part of their full dress.

In addition to the full dress uniform, a scarlet-coloured mess jacket is a part of the authorized mess dress for members of the Canadian Army. Several other Canadian uniforms are also derived from the scarlet tunic. Members of the City of Toronto Honour Guard, a group of veterans that are employed in the local civil service, wear a scarlet tunic based on Governor General's Foot Guards. The dress uniform of the Royal Canadian Mounted Police, a federal law enforcement agency, also incorporates elements of a red coat, referred to as the Red Serge.

=== New Zealand ===
During the 19th century, several volunteer militias in New Zealand wore a variety of scarlet, dark blue, or green tunics, closely following the contemporary uniforms of the British Army. The British red coat coincidentally matched Māori sensibilities of the colour red itself as a symbol of mana and sacred authority: Moehanga once requested Peter Dillon a trip to Calcutta to precure a red coat there, and one Edward Markham recorded that Maori visitors to the landed HMS Alligator in Waitangi in 1834 had “much greater fear of the Red than the Blue jackets” i.e. the sailors of Alligator. Presently however, the New Zealand Army Band and the Officer Cadet School are the only units of the New Zealand Army that use the scarlet tunic as part of their ceremonial full dress uniforms.

In addition to full dress, the standard mess dress for the New Zealand Army includes a scarlet jacket with dark blue/black lapels.

=== United Kingdom ===
The scarlet tunic remains in the current British Army Dress Regulations. It is one of three coloured tunics used by the British Army; alongside dark green tunics (used by The Rifles and Royal Gurkha Rifles), and dark blue tunics (used by several units, such as the Royal Artillery). The scarlet tunic is presently used as part of the full dress uniforms for the Life Guards and several other cavalry units, the Foot Guards, the Royal Engineers, line infantry regiments, generals, and most army staff officers of the British Army. The locally recruited Royal Gibraltar Regiment also uses a scarlet tunic as part of its winter ceremonial dress.

In addition, the scarlet tunic is still used by some regimental bands or drummers for ceremonial purposes. Officers and NCOs of those regiments which previously wore red retain scarlet as the colour of their "mess" or formal evening jackets. Some regiments turn out small detachments, such as colour guards, in scarlet full dress at their own expense, e.g. the Yorkshire Regiment before amalgamation.

==== Use with the Sovereign's Bodyguard ====
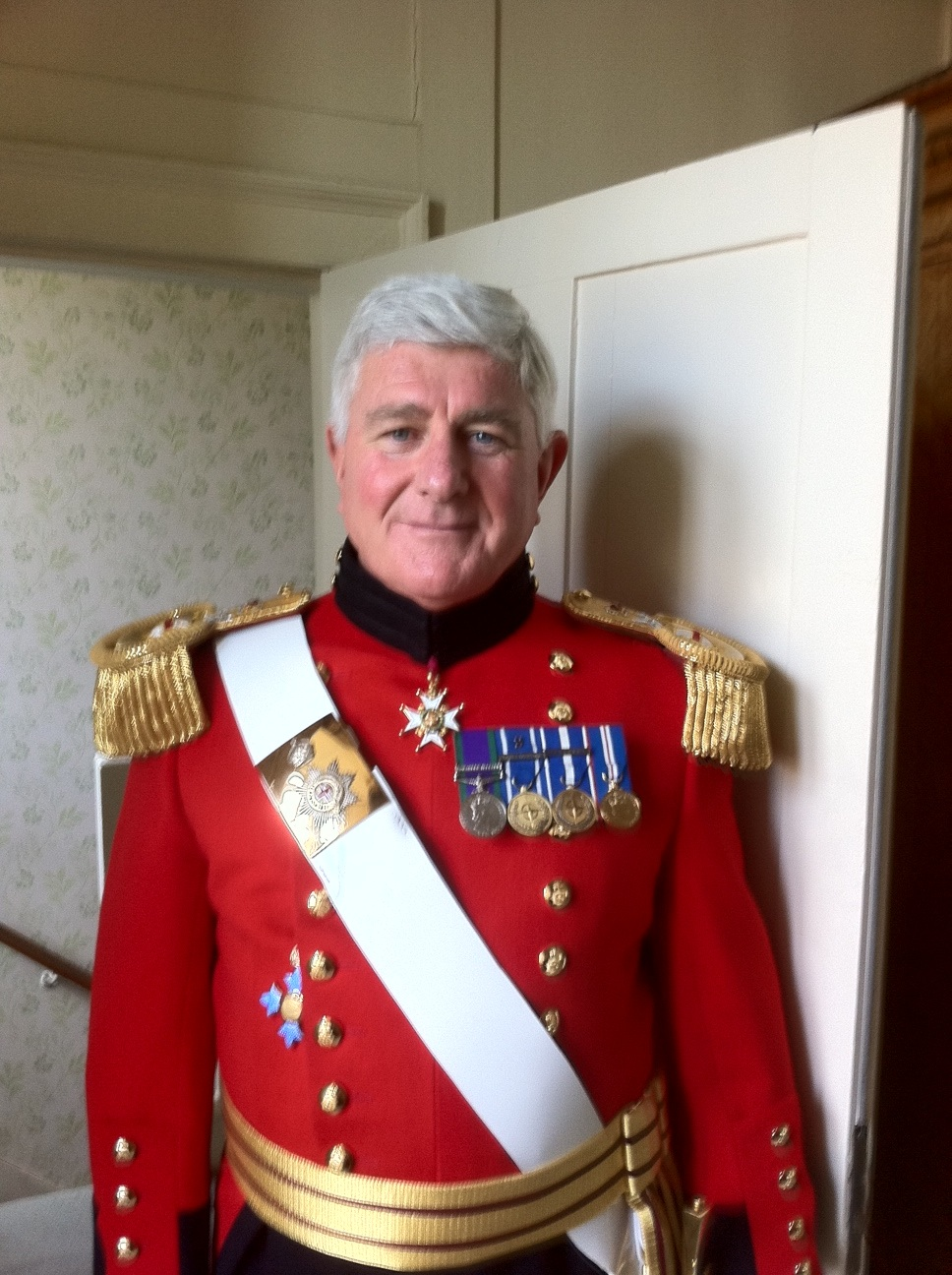
Lieutenant General Peter Pearson wearing the scarlet tunic used by the Military Knights of Windsor.

The Honourable Corps of Gentlemen at Arms, the Military Knights of Windsor and the Yeoman of the Guard, are ceremonial units known as the Sovereign's Bodyguard. The first two wear an early 19th century scarlet officer tunic when performing ceremonial tasks. The Yeomen wear a scarlet frock of Tudor style.

== Rationale for red ==
From the modern perspective, the retention of a highly conspicuous colour such as red for active service appears inexplicable and foolhardy, regardless of how striking it may have looked on the parade ground. However, in the days of the musket (a weapon of limited range and accuracy) and black powder, battle field visibility was quickly obscured by clouds of smoke. Bright colours provided a means of distinguishing friend from foe without significantly adding risk. Furthermore, the vegetable dyes used until the 19th century would fade over time to a pink or ruddy-brown, so on a long campaign in a hot climate the colour was less conspicuous than the modern scarlet shade would be. As formal battles of the time commonly involved deployment in columns and lines, the individual soldier was not likely to be a target by himself.

=== Within the British Empire ===
There is no universally accepted explanation as to why the British wore red. As noted above, the 16th century military historian Julius Ferretus asserted that the colour red was favoured because of the supposedly demoralising effect of blood stains on a uniform of a lighter colour.

In his book British Military Uniforms (Hamylyn Publishing Group 1968), the military historian W. Y. Carman traces in considerable detail the slow evolution of red as the English soldier's colour, from the Tudors to the Stuarts. The reasons that emerge are a mixture of financial (cheaper red, russet or crimson dyes), cultural (a growing popular sense that red was the sign of an English soldier), and simple chance (an order of 1594 is that coats "be of such colours as you can best provide").

Before the Tudor period, red frequently appeared in the cloth livery provided for the household personnel—including guard troops—of many European royal houses and Italian or Church principalities. Red or purple had provided a rich distinction for senior clerics through the Middle Ages in the hierarchy of colours distinguishing the Roman Church.

During the English Civil War red dyes were imported in large quantities for use by units and individuals of both sides, though this was the beginning of the trend for long overcoats. The ready availability of red pigment made it popular for military clothing, and the dying process required for red involved only one stage. Other colours required the mixing of dyes in two stages and accordingly involved greater expense; blue, for example, could be obtained with woad, but more popularly it became the much more expensive indigo. In financial terms the only cheaper alternative was the grey-white of undyed wool—an option favoured by the French, Austrian, Spanish and other Continental armies. The formation of the first English standing army (Parliamentarian New Model Army in 1645) saw red clothing as the standard dress. As Carman comments, "The red coat was now firmly established as the sign of an Englishman."

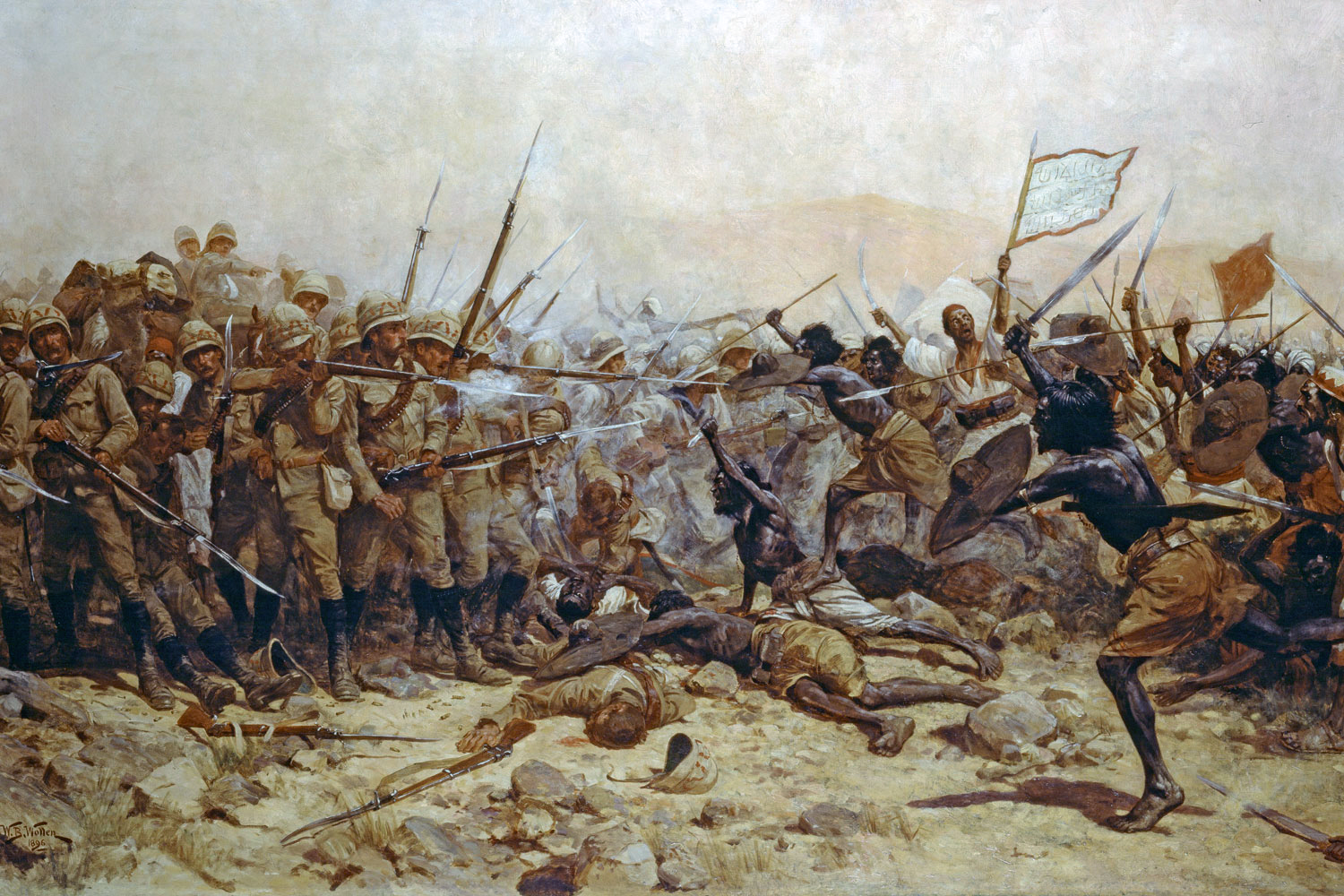
The rise of rifles and smokeless powder led the scarlet tunic to be phased out of combat in the late-19th century in favour of drab uniforms.

On traditional battlefields with large engagements, visibility was not considered a military disadvantage until the general adoption of rifles in the 1850s, followed by smokeless powder after 1880. The value of drab clothing was quickly recognised by the British Army, who introduced khaki drill for Indian and colonial warfare from the mid-19th century on. As part of a series of reforms following the Second Boer War (which had been fought in this inconspicuous clothing of Indian origin), a darker khaki serge was adopted in 1902 for service dress in Britain itself. From then on, the red coat continued as a dress item only, retained for reasons both of national sentiment and its value in recruiting. The British military authorities were more practical in their considerations than their French counterparts, who incurred heavy casualties by retaining highly visible blue coats and red trousers for active service until several months into World War I.

==== As a symbol ====
The epithet "redcoats" is familiar throughout much of the former British Empire, even though this colour was by no means exclusive to the British Army. The entire Danish Army wore red coats up to 1848, and particular units in the German, French, Austro-Hungarian, Russian, Bulgarian and Romanian armies retained red uniforms until 1914 or later. Amongst other diverse examples, Spanish hussars, Japanese Navy and United States Marine Corps bandsmen, and Serbian generals had red tunics as part of their gala or court dress during this period. In 1827 United States Artillery company musicians were wearing red coats as a reversal of their branch facing colour. However the extensive use of this colour by British, Indian and other Imperial soldiers over a period of nearly three hundred years made red uniform a veritable icon of the British Empire. The significance of military red as a national symbol was endorsed by King William IV (reigned 1830–1837) when light dragoons and lancers had scarlet jackets substituted for their previous dark blue, hussars adopted red pelisses, and even the Royal Navy were obliged to adopt red facings instead of white. Most of these changes were reversed under Queen Victoria (1837–1901). A red coat and black tricorne remains part of the ceremonial and out-of-hospital dress for in-pensioners at the Royal Hospital Chelsea.

== Material used ==
Whether scarlet or red, the uniform coat has historically been made of wool, with a lining of loosely woven wool known as bay to give shape to the garment. The modern scarlet wool is supplied by Abimelech Hainsworth and is much lighter in weight than the traditional material, which was intended for hard wear on active service.

The cloth for private soldiers used up until the late 18th century was plain weave broadcloth weighing 16 ounces per square yard (540 g/m^{2}), made from coarser blends of English wool. The weights often quoted in contemporary documents are given per running yard, though; so for a cloth of 54 inches (140 cm) width a yard weighed 24 ounces (680 g). This sometimes leads to the erroneous statement that the cloth weighed 24 oz per square yard.

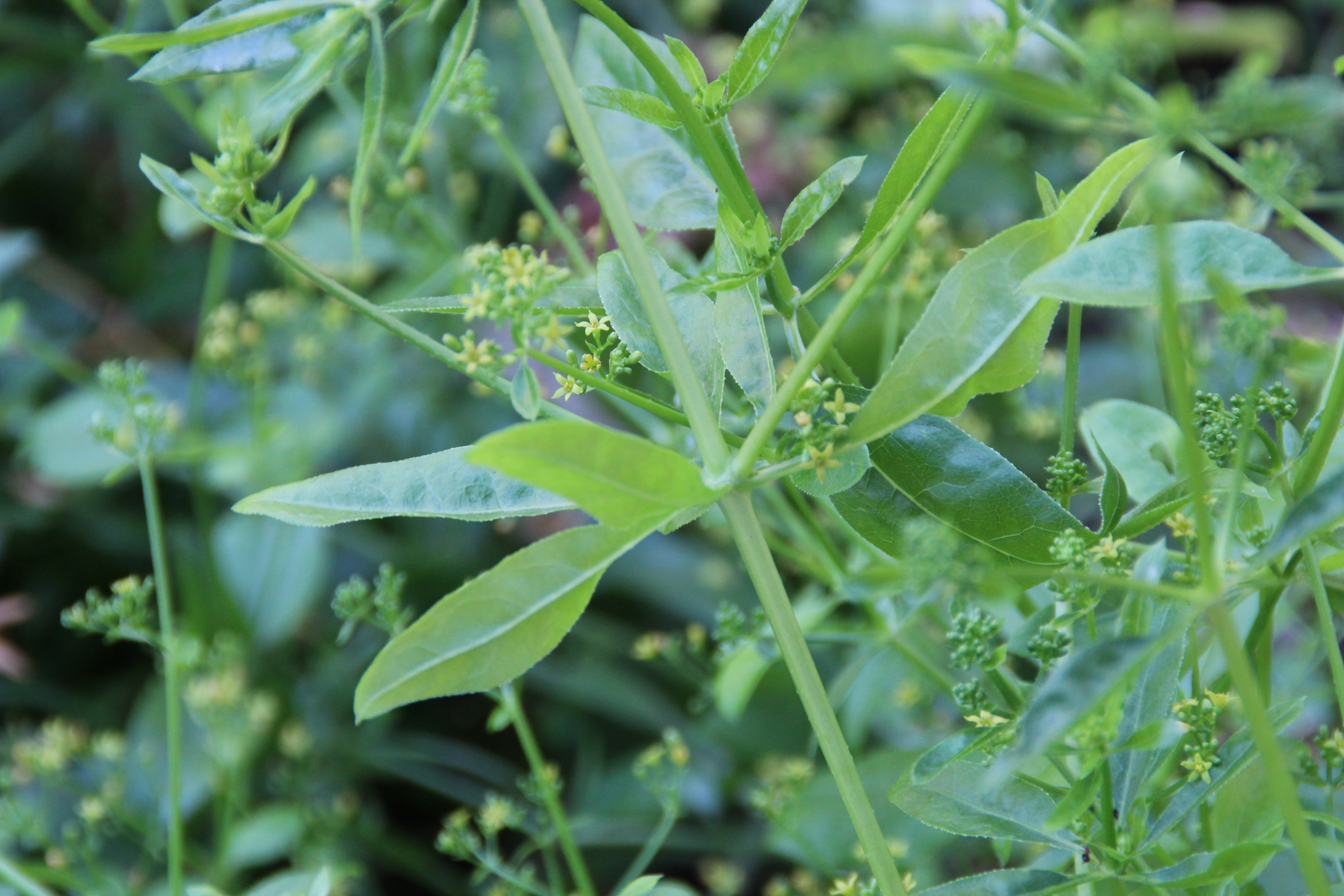
The stems of Rubia tinctorum were used to make the rose madder dye. Rose madder was commonly used for the coats of privates.

Broadcloth is so called not because it is finished wide, 54 inches not being particularly wide, but because it was woven nearly half as wide again and shrunk down to finish 54 inches. This shrinking, or milling, process made the cloth very dense, bringing all the threads very tightly together, and gave a felted blind finish to the cloth. These factors meant that it was harder-wearing, more weatherproof and could take a raw edge; the hems of the garment could be simply cut and left without hemming as the threads were so heavily shrunk together as to prevent fraying.

Officers' coats were made from superfine broadcloth; manufactured from much finer imported Spanish wool, spun finer and with more warps and wefts per inch. The result was a slightly lighter cloth than that used for privates, still essentially a broadcloth and maintaining the characteristics of that cloth, but slightly lighter and with a much finer quality finish. The dye used for privates' coats of the infantry, guard and line, was rose madder. A vegetable dye, it was recognised as economical, simple and reliable and remained the first choice for lower quality reds from the ancient world until chemical dyes became cheaper in the latter 19th century.

Infantry sergeants, some cavalry regiments and many volunteer corps (which were often formed from prosperous middle-class citizens who paid for their own uniforms) used various mock scarlets; a brighter red but derived from cheaper materials than the cochineal used for officers' coats. Various dye sources were used for these middle quality reds, but lac dye, extracted from a kind of scale insect "lac insects" which produce resin shellac, was the most common basis.

The noncommissioned officer's red coat issued under the warrant of 1768 was dyed with a mixture of madder-red and cochineal to produce a "lesser scarlet"; brighter than the red worn by other ranks but cheaper than the pure cochineal dyed garment purchased by officers as a personal order from military tailors. Officers' superfine broadcloth was dyed true scarlet with cochineal, a dye derived from insects. This was a more expensive process but produced a distinctive colour that was the speciality of 18th-century English dyers.

The most notable centre for dying "British scarlet" cloth was Stroud in Gloucestershire, which also dyed cloth for many foreign armies. An 1823 recipe for dying 60 pounds (lbs) - about 27 kg - of military woollen cloth lists: 1 lb of cochineal, 3 lbs madder, 6 lbs argol (potassium tartrate), 3 lbs alum, 4 pints tin liquor (stannous chloride), 6 lbs cudbear (orcein) and two buckets of urine. The alum, argol and tin liquor, which acted as mordants or dye fixatives, were boiled together for half an hour, and the madder and cochineal were added for another ten minutes. The cloth was added and boiled for two hours; after that, the cloth was drained and immersed in cudbear and urine for another two hours. The cloth was stretched out to dry on tenters, then finally brushed with teasels and tightly rolled to produce a sheen.

During the 18th and much of the nineteenth centuries the cheaply made coats of other ranks in the British army were produced by a variety of contractors, using the laborious process of dyeing described above. Accordingly, even when new, batches of garments sent to regiments might be issued in different shades of red. This tendency towards variations in appearance, commented on by contemporary observers, would subsequently be compounded by weather bleaching and soaking.)

== Red uniforms in non-Commonwealth armed forces ==
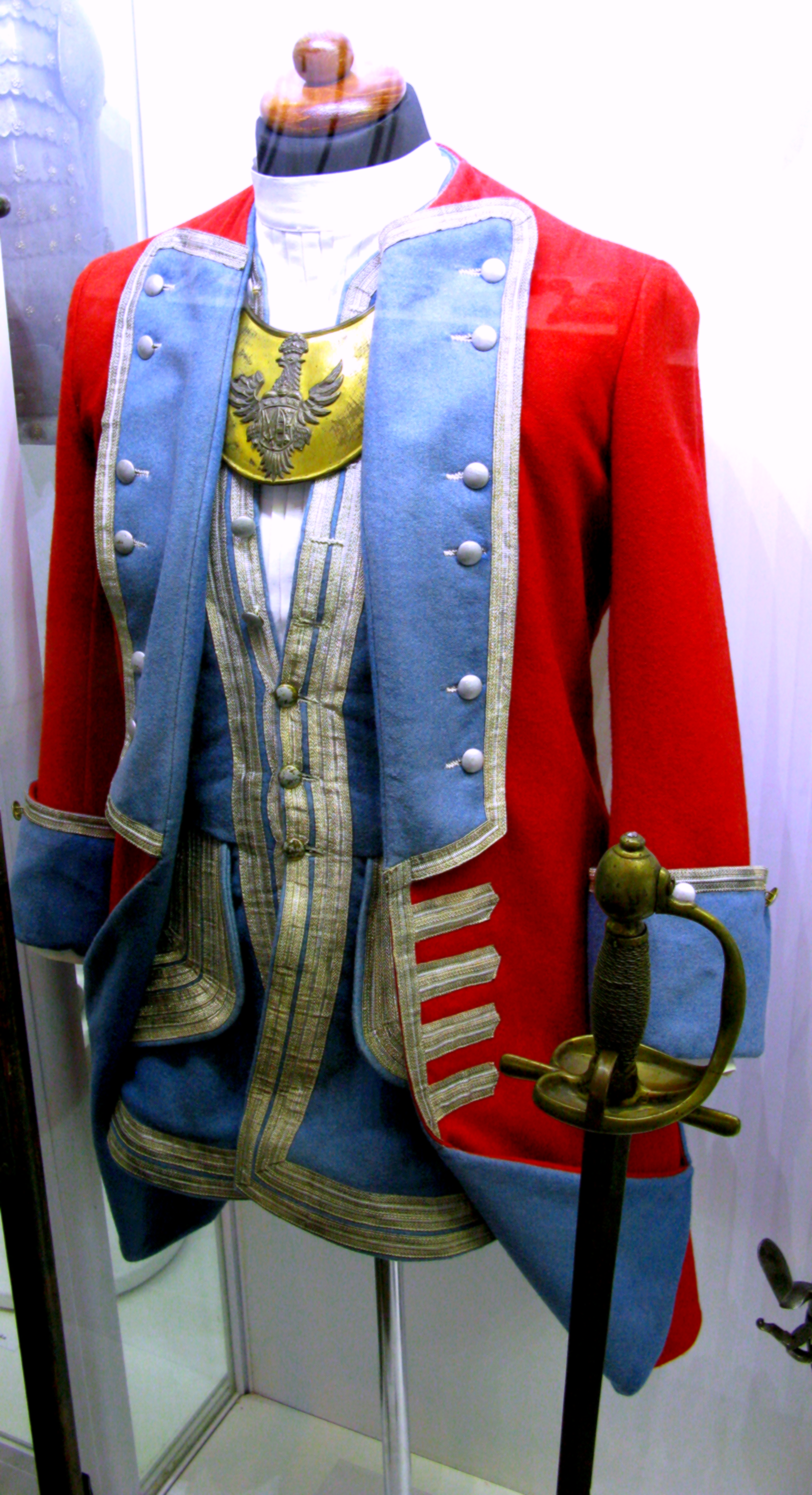
Officer's uniform for the Royal Foot Guards of the Polish–Lithuanian Commonwealth, 1732.

Although the term red coat is most often associated with British soldiers in the English language, several other armed forces have used red-coloured coats as a part of their uniform.

The term redshirts was also used in mid-19th century Italy to refer to volunteers who followed Giuseppe Garibaldi during the unification of Italy. However, the term redshirt is derived from the red shirts or loose-fitting blouses worn by volunteers, as opposed to a specific piece of military garment.

=== Historic uses ===
Several military forces have used red-coloured coats in the past. The combined Denmark–Norway army wore red uniforms from the 17th century to the union's dissolution in 1814. A number of Danish Army infantry, cavalry and artillery regiments continued to wear red coats from 1814 to 1848, when they were replaced by dark blue service tunics. Members of the Paraguayan Army also wore red-coloured coats during the War of the Triple Alliance (1864–1870). Members of the Royal Burmese Armed Forces were also recorded to have worn western-style red-coloured uniforms during the 18th and 19th centuries.

Certain specific military units have also historically worn red-coloured coats. The Royal Polish Guards of the Polish–Lithuanian Commonwealth, wore a red cloth jacket with white lapels and a blue or turquoise vest, and a red coat made of wool during the winter season. The line infantry regiments of the Army of the Papal States were characterised by red coats and breeches during the 1730s. During the Venezuelan War of Independence, the Ejército Libertador (Army of Liberation) adopted the red hussar cavalry uniforms used by the British Legions' Company of Honor Guard for Simón Bolívar. Prior to World War I, officers of the Prussian Army's Guard Cuirassier Regiment wore scarlet tunics as part of their gala uniform for court functions.

Several French Army units have also historically worn red-coloured coats, including the Irish Brigade (1690–1792), who supposedly wore red-coloured coats to show their origins and continued loyalty to the cause of Jacobitism; and Swiss mercenary regiments in the French Army, including the Swiss Guards, from the mid-17th to early 19th centuries. The French North African spahi regiments also wore madder-red zouave style jackets until their disbandment in 1962.

=== Modern uses ===
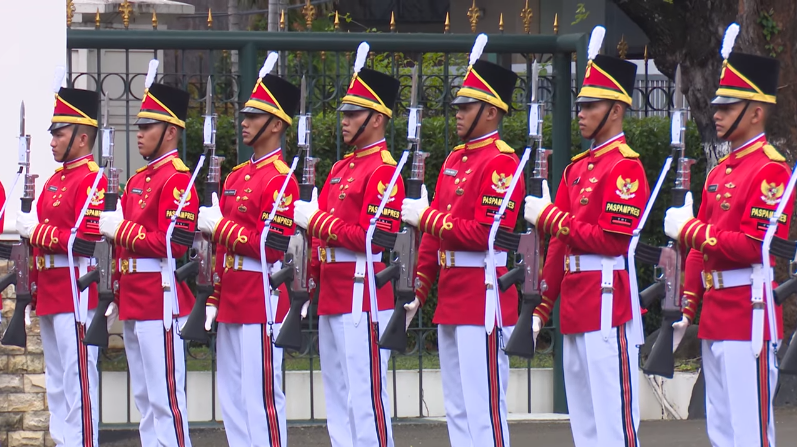
The Presidential Security Force of Indonesia with their red and white uniform. The uniform is used for state-level ceremonies.

Several military units continue to use a red-coloured coat as a part of their ceremonial uniform. In Europe, red-coloured coats are still used by the Danish Royal Life Guards, and the Garderegiment Fuseliers Prinses Irene of the Royal Netherlands Army. The latter unit's red-coloured tunics are derived from British style red coats, in commemoration of the unit's foundation in exile in the United Kingdom during World War II.

Several South American units continue to wear red-coloured coats for ceremonial purposes, including the Brazilian Marine Corps, and the Bolivian Colorados Regiment (colorados meaning red in the Spanish language). Several Venezuelan Army units also use a red-coloured coat as a part of their parade uniforms, including the Presidential Honor Guard, the Compañia de Honor "24 de Junio" (Company of Honor "24 de Junio") and the Bolivarian Militia of Venezuela.

Red-coloured coats also see some use in Asia, providing part of a unit's ceremonial uniform. The ceremonial honour guard uniform for the military of Myanmar includes red tunics. In Indonesia, a detachment from the Presidential Security Force of Indonesia (Paspampres) Honour guards wears red tunics as part of their full dress.

==== United States ====
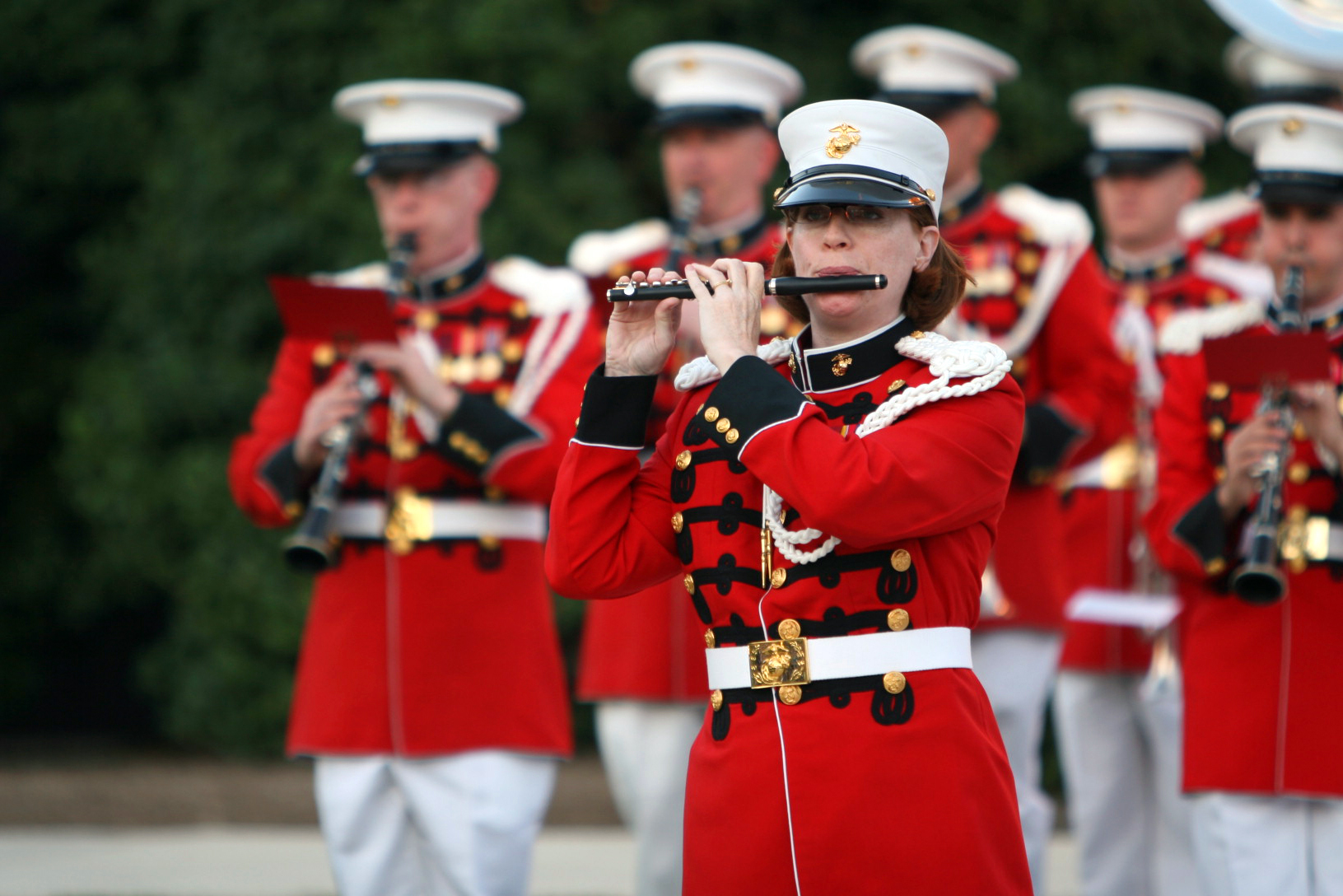
The United States Marine Band wears a red uniform for performances at the White House and elsewhere.

Members of the United States Army Old Guard Fife and Drum Corps, United States Marine Band and the United States Marine Drum and Bugle Corps wear red coats for performances at the White House and elsewhere. This is a rare survival of the common 18th-century practice of having military bandsmen wear coats in reverse colors to the rest of a given unit. (United States Marines wear dark blue (almost black in appearance) tunics with red piping, so United States Marine bandsmen wear red tunics with dark blue piping.)

== Gallery ==
17th–18th century

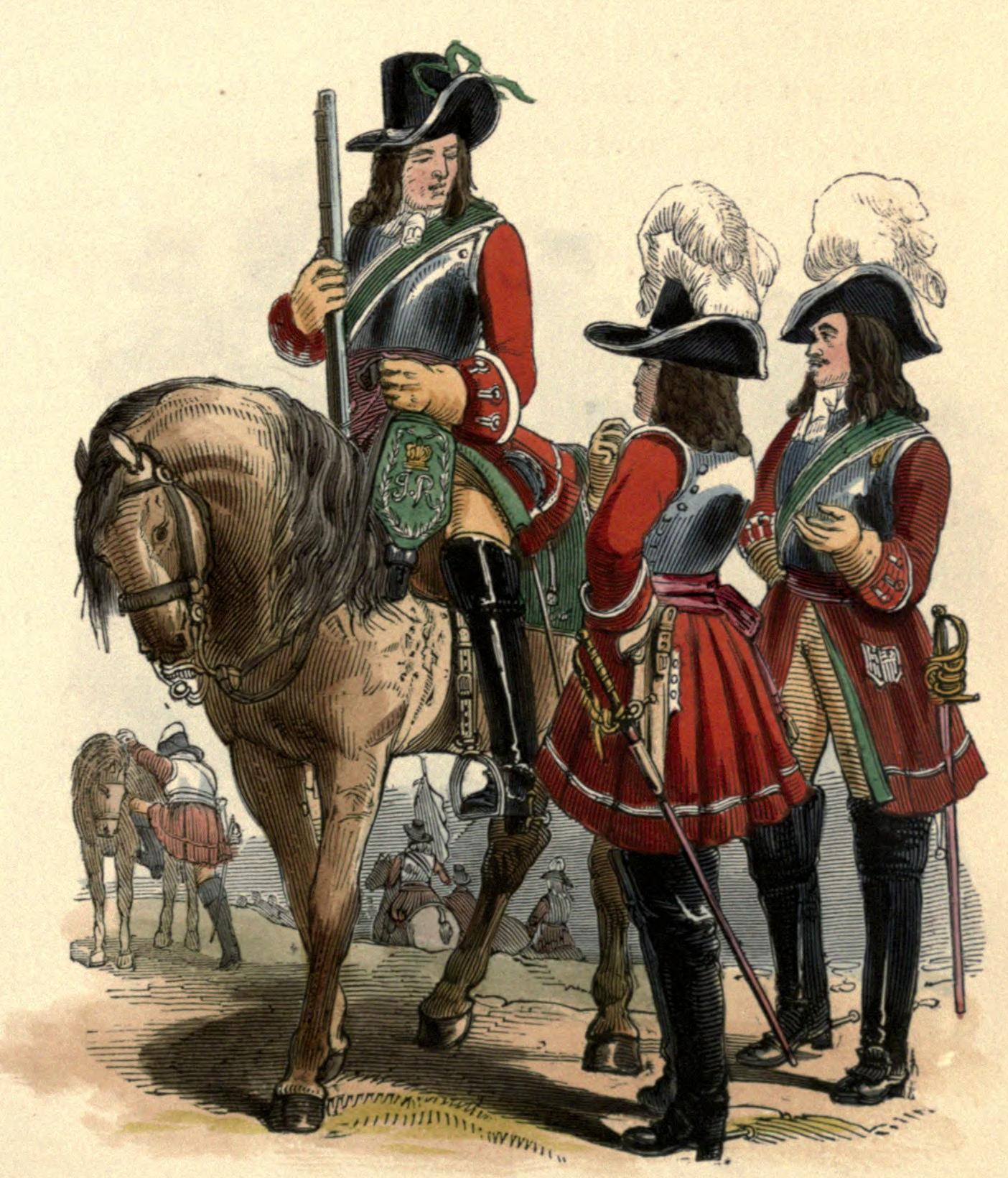
Troops of the 4th Regiment of Horse, 1687

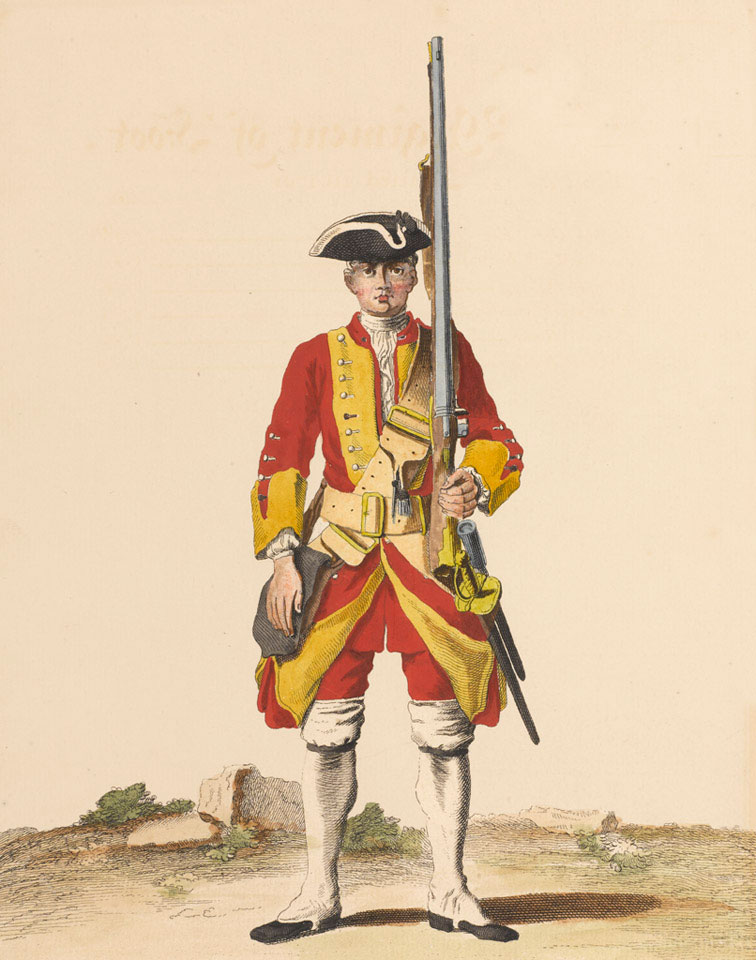
Private of the 29th Regiment of Foot, c. 1742

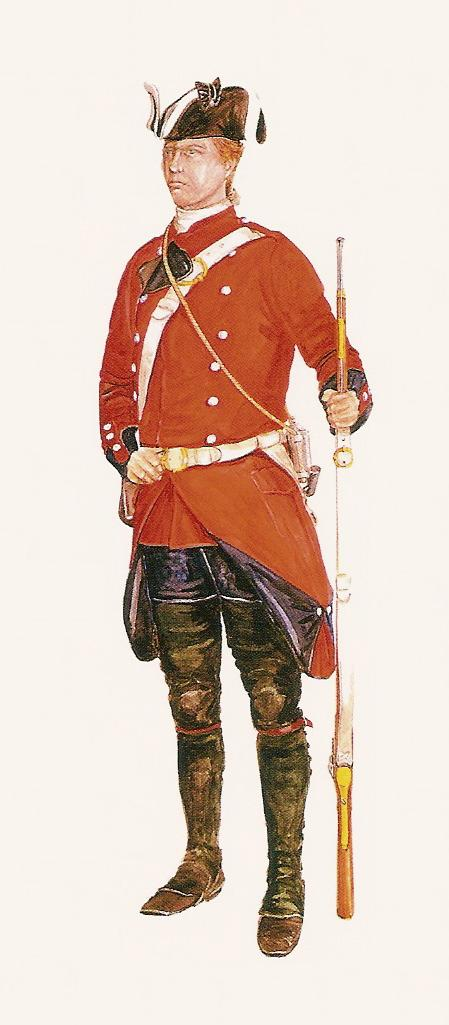
Private of the 60th (Royal American) Regiment of Foot, 1758

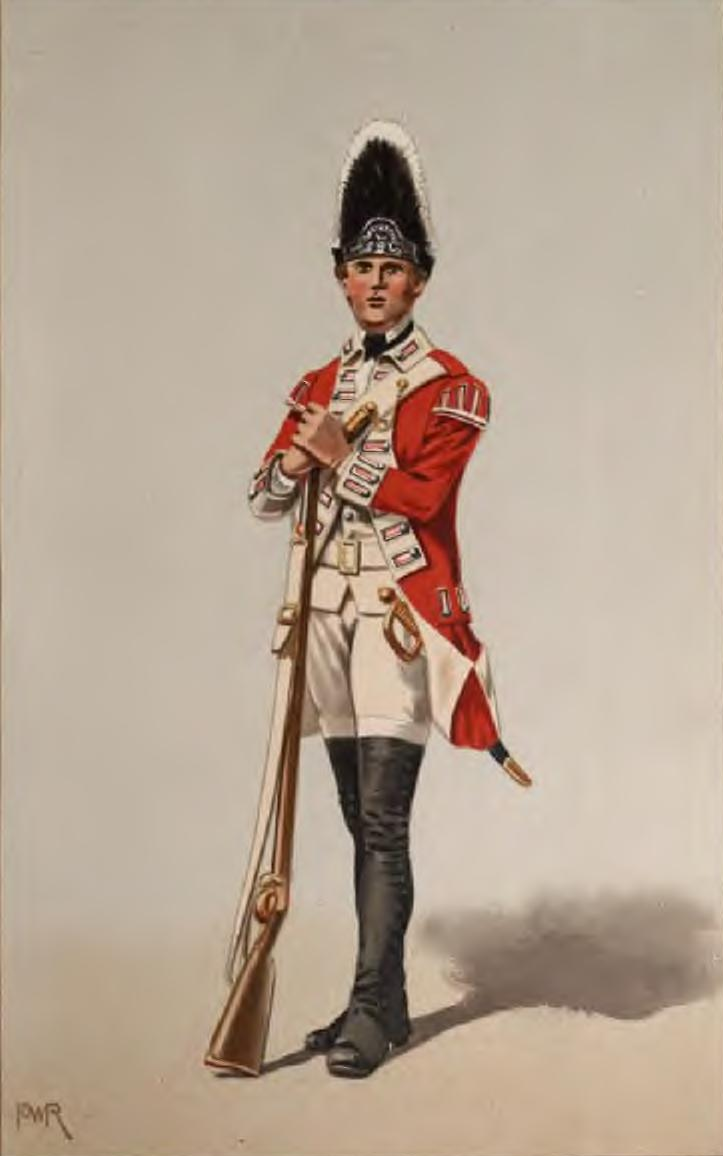
Grenadier of the 40th Regiment of Foot, 1767

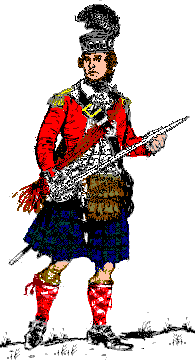
Officer of the 71st Regiment of Foot, 1776
19th century

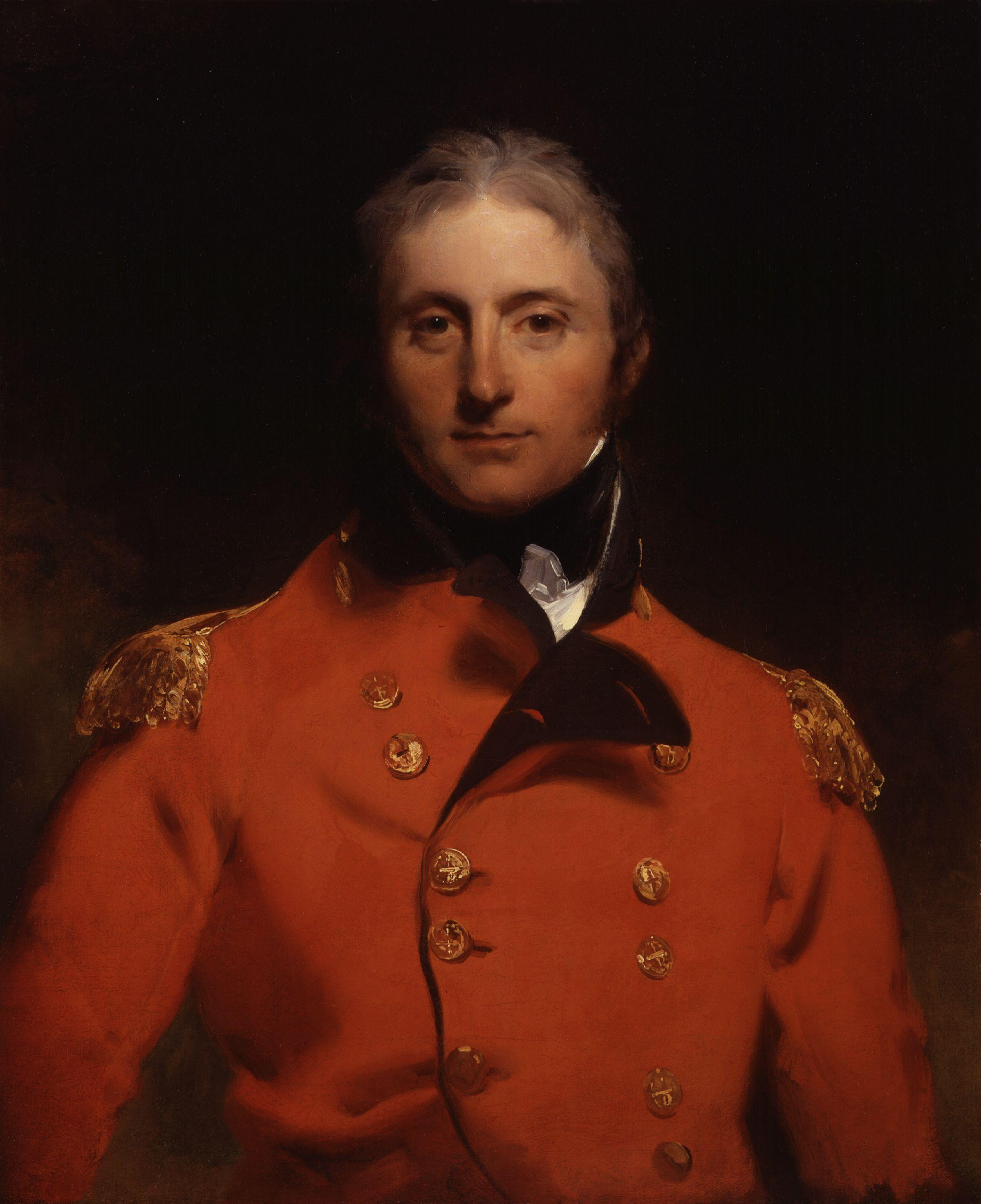
Portrait of Sir John Moore by Thomas Lawrence, c. 1804

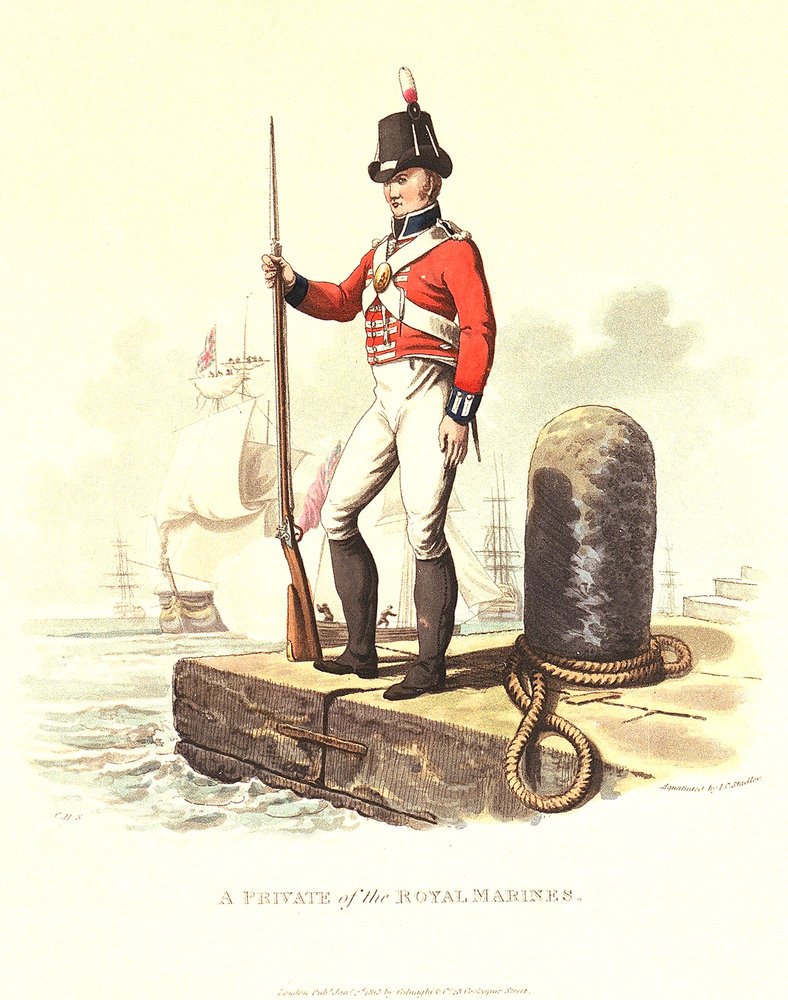
Private of the Royal Marines, 1815

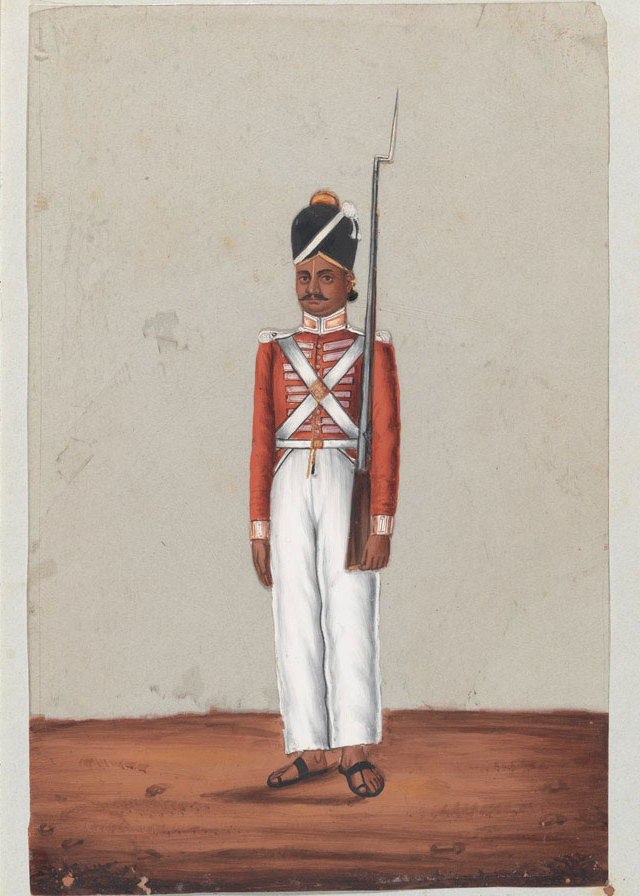
Sepoy of the Madras Army, 1835

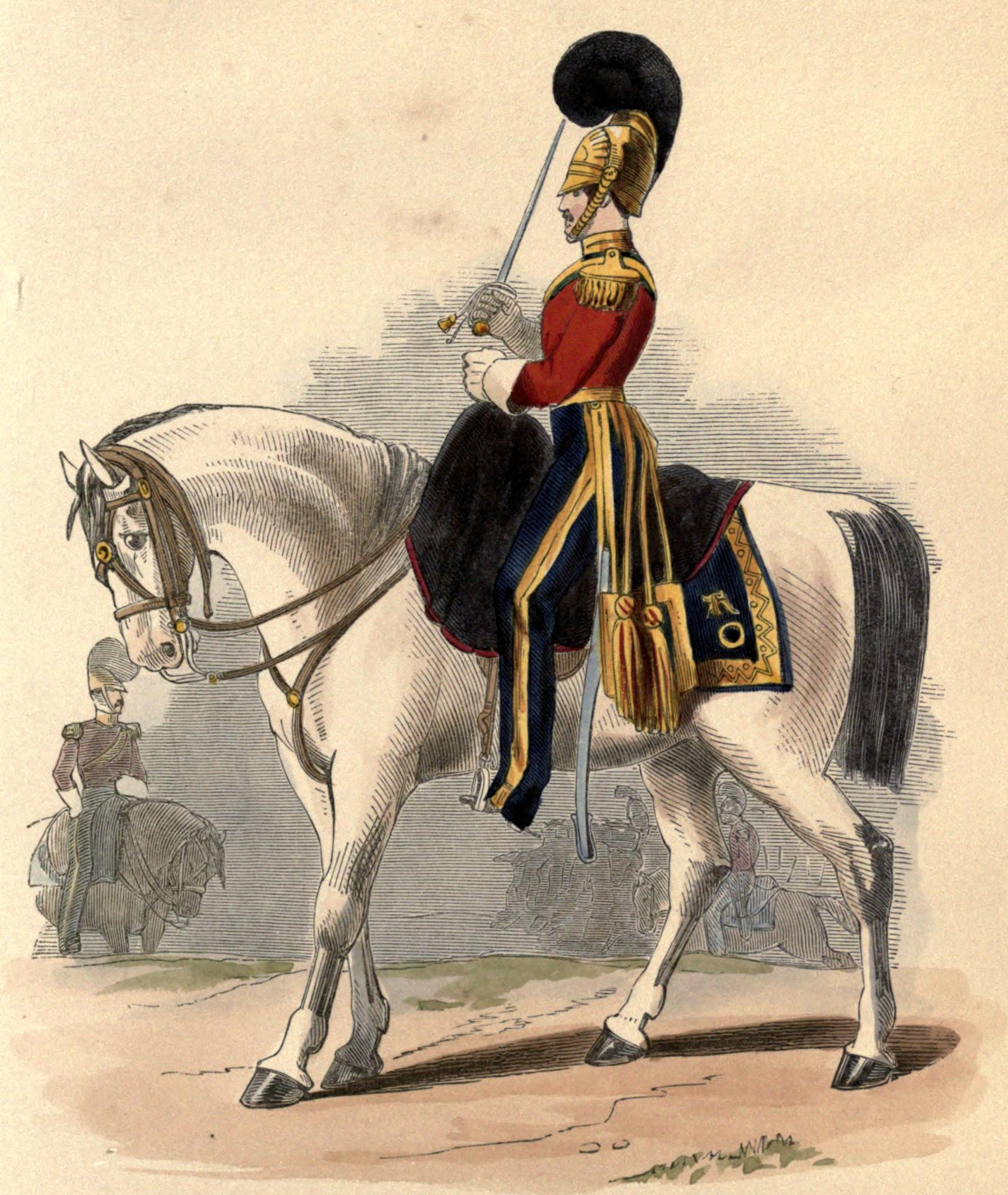
Officer of the 1st Dragoons, 1839

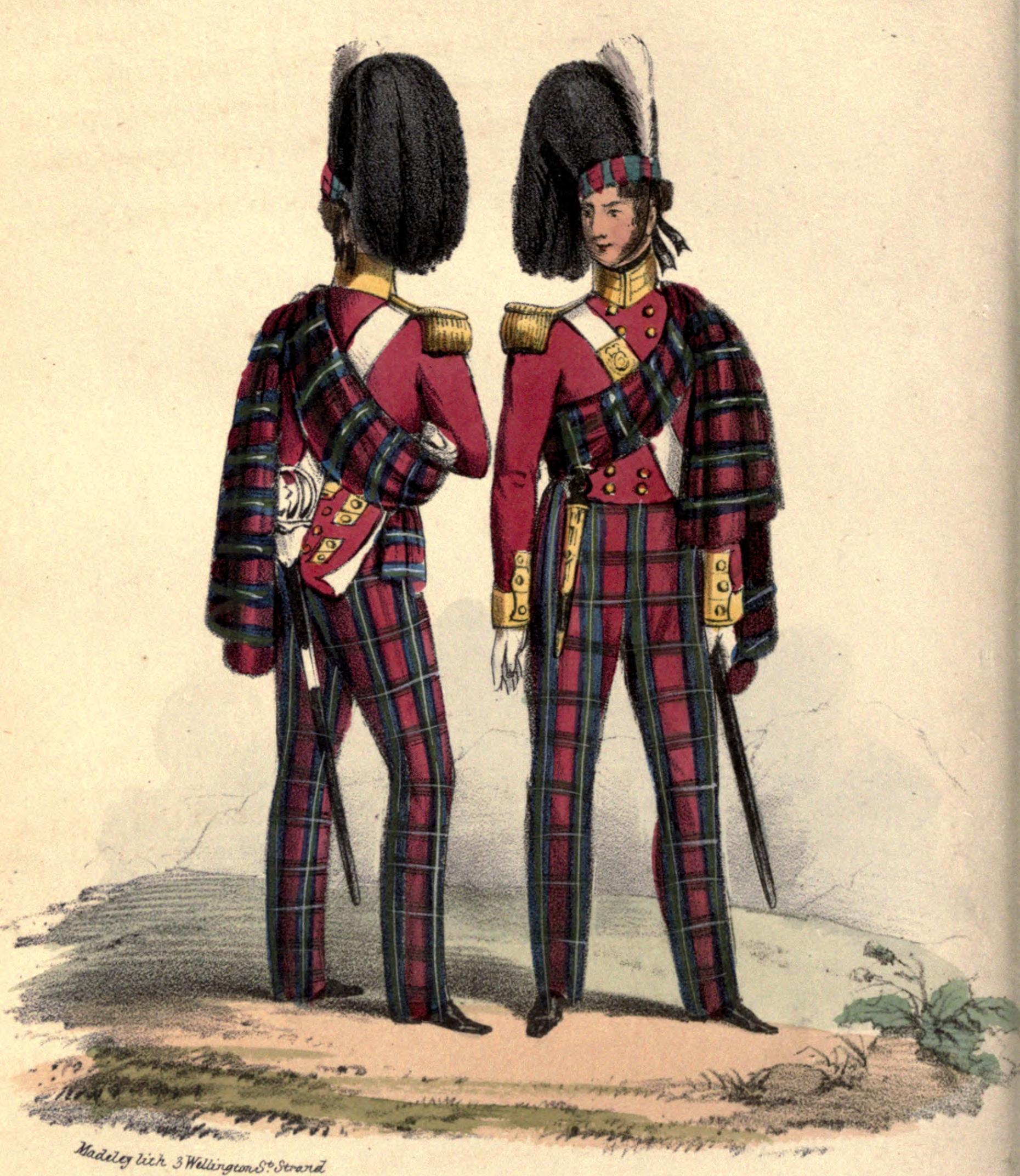
Officers of the 72nd Regiment, Duke of Albany's Own Highlanders, 1848

Troops of the King's (Liverpool) Regiment, 1891
20th century

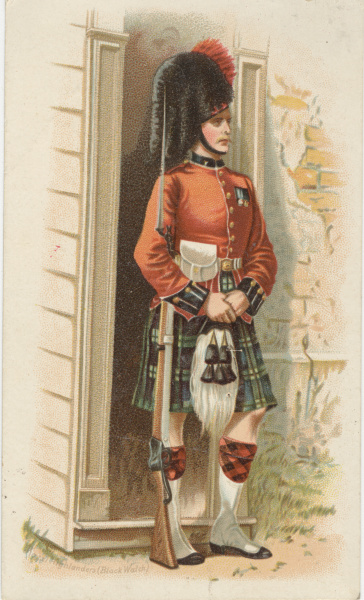
Soldier of the Black Watch, c. 1900

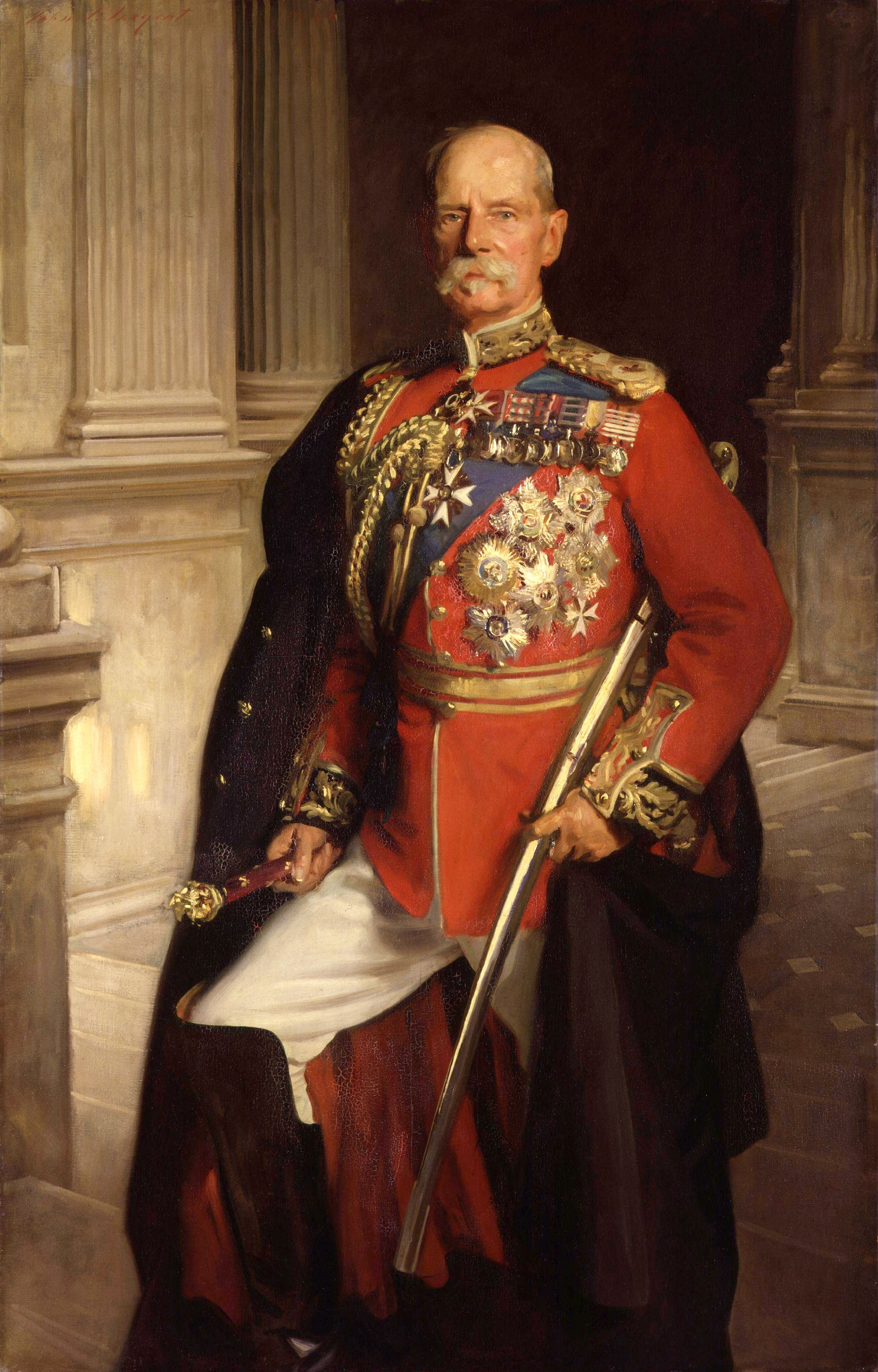
Field Marshal Frederick Roberts, 1st Earl Roberts, 1906

Parade of the Royal Fusiliers, c. 1916

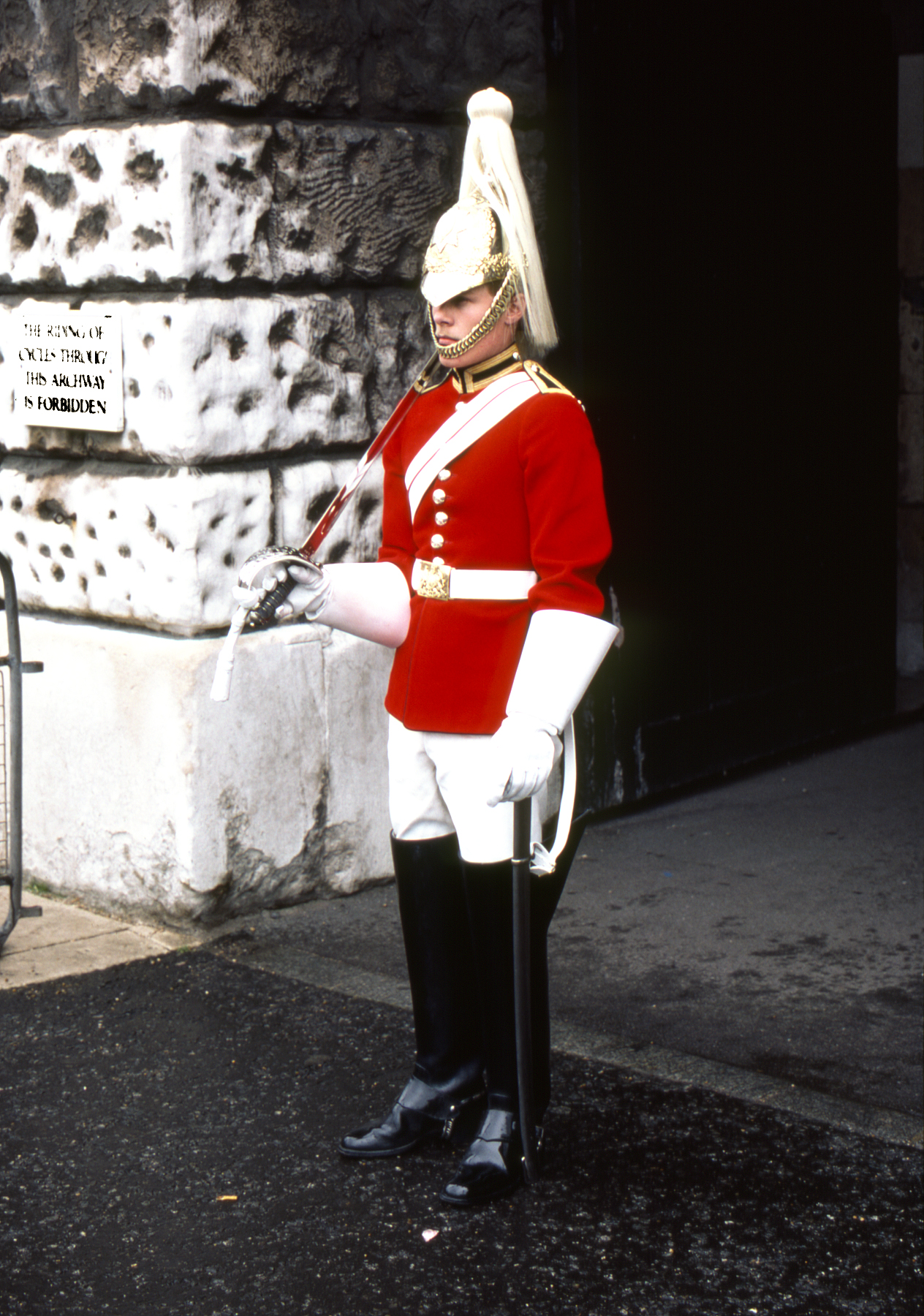
Soldier of the Life Guards, 1983

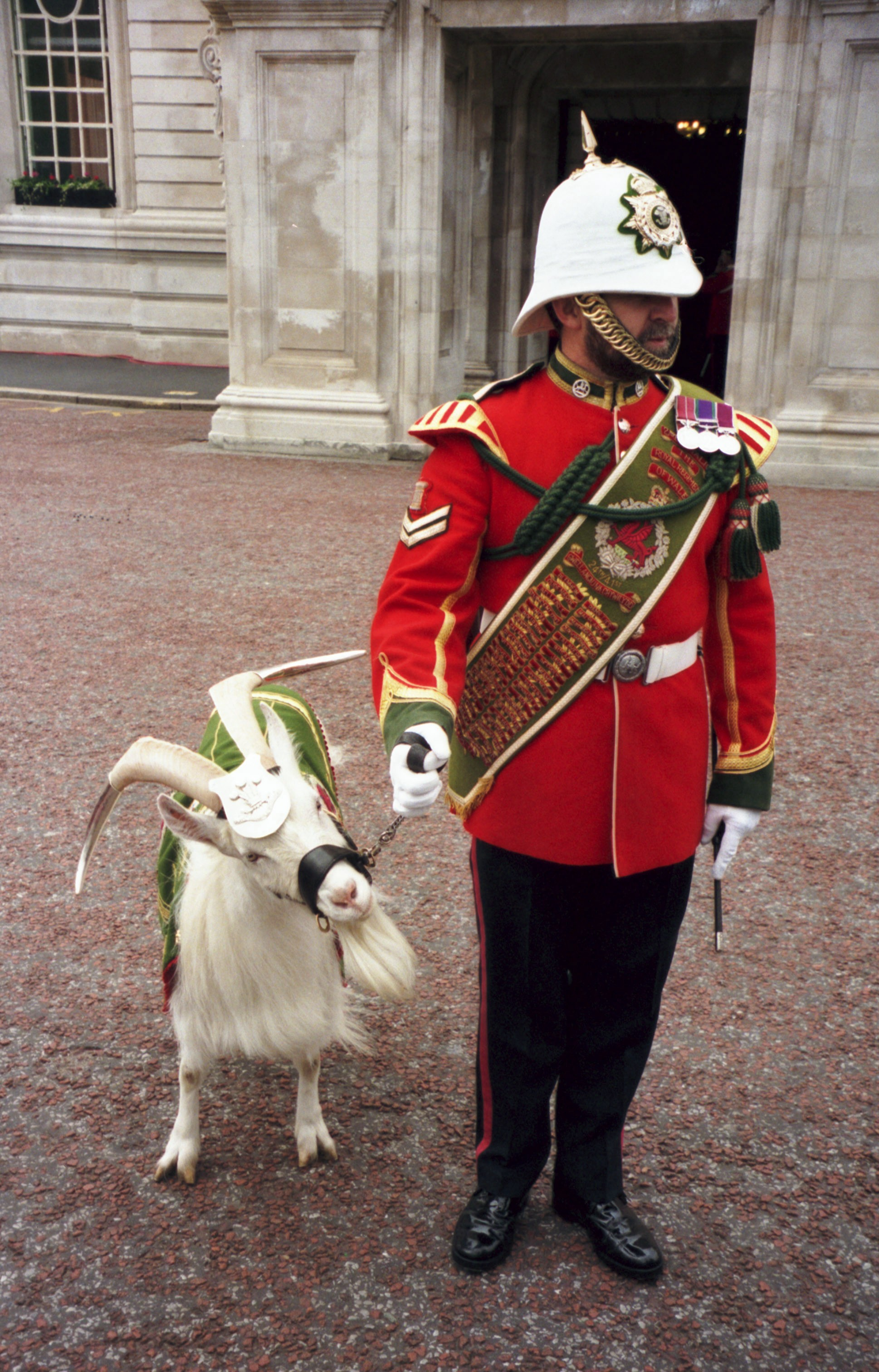
Mascot and Goat Major of the Royal Regiment of Wales, 1999
21st century

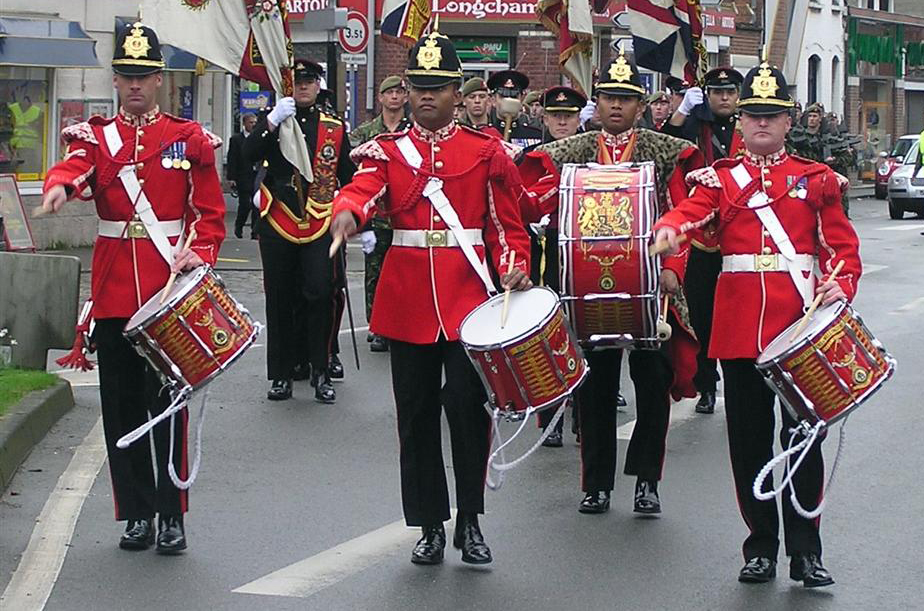
Drummers of the Duke of Wellington's Regiment, 2008

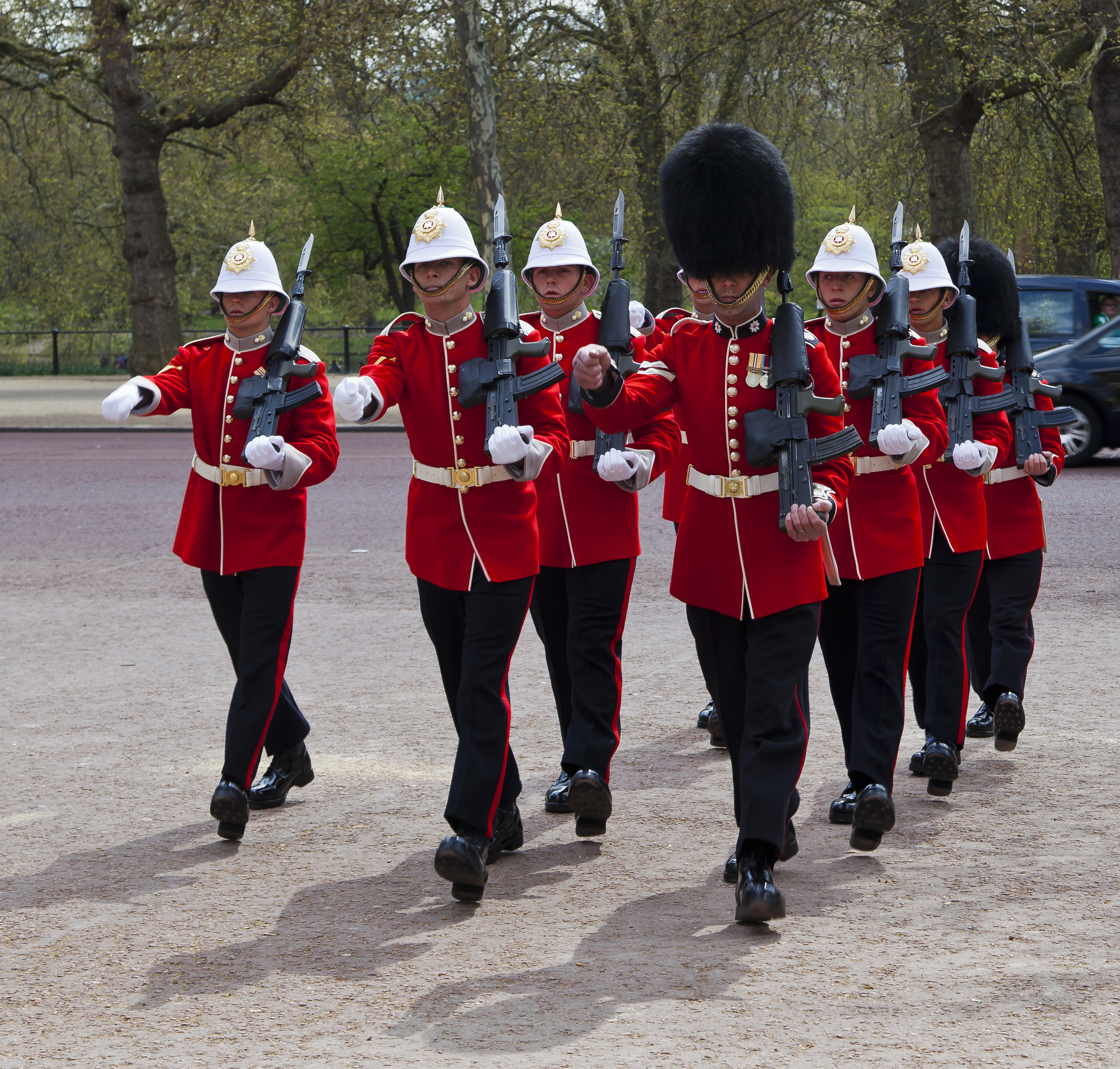
Soldiers of the Coldstream Guards and the Royal Gibraltar Regiment, 2012

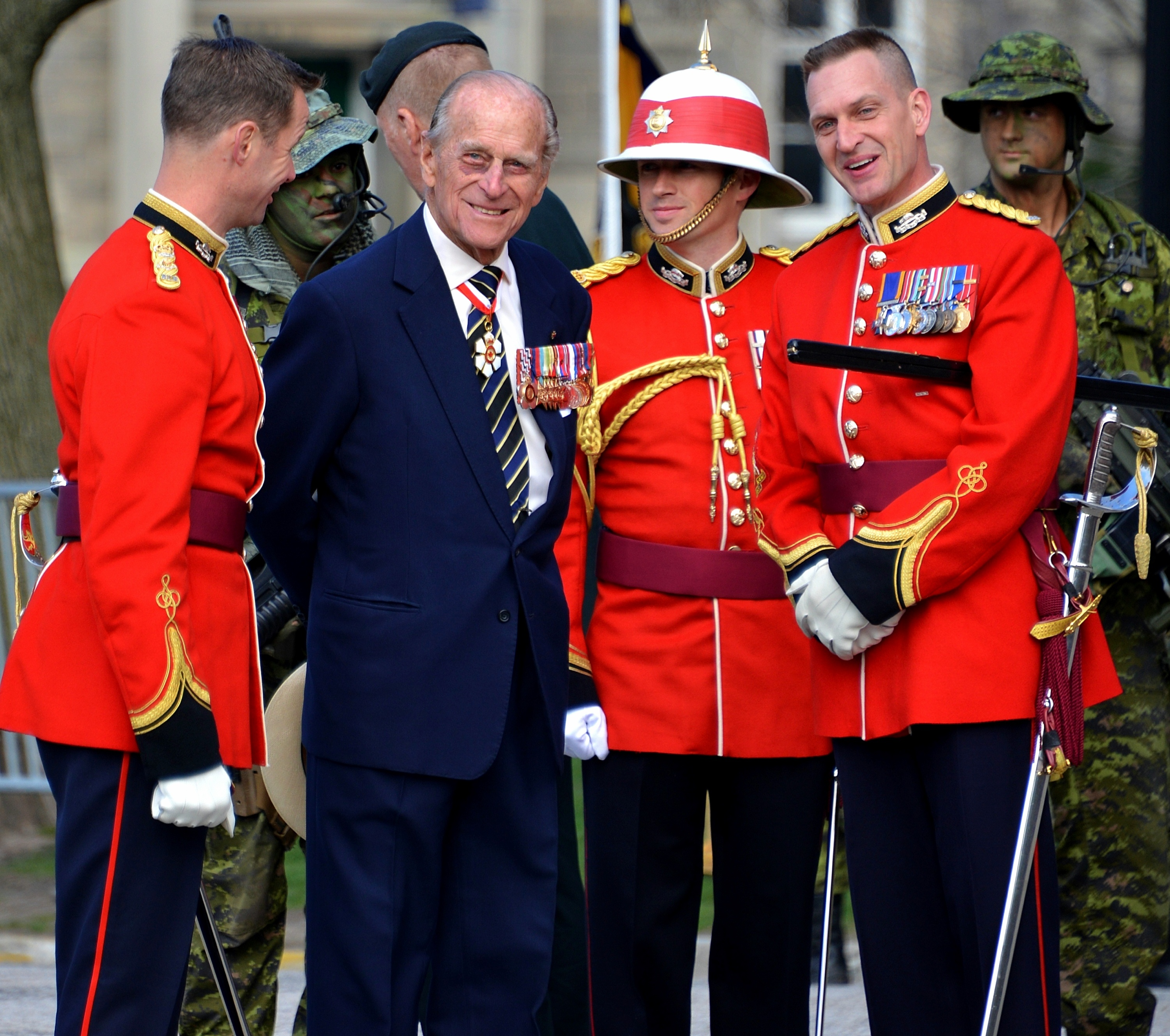
Members of the Royal Canadian Regiment and Prince Philip, 2013

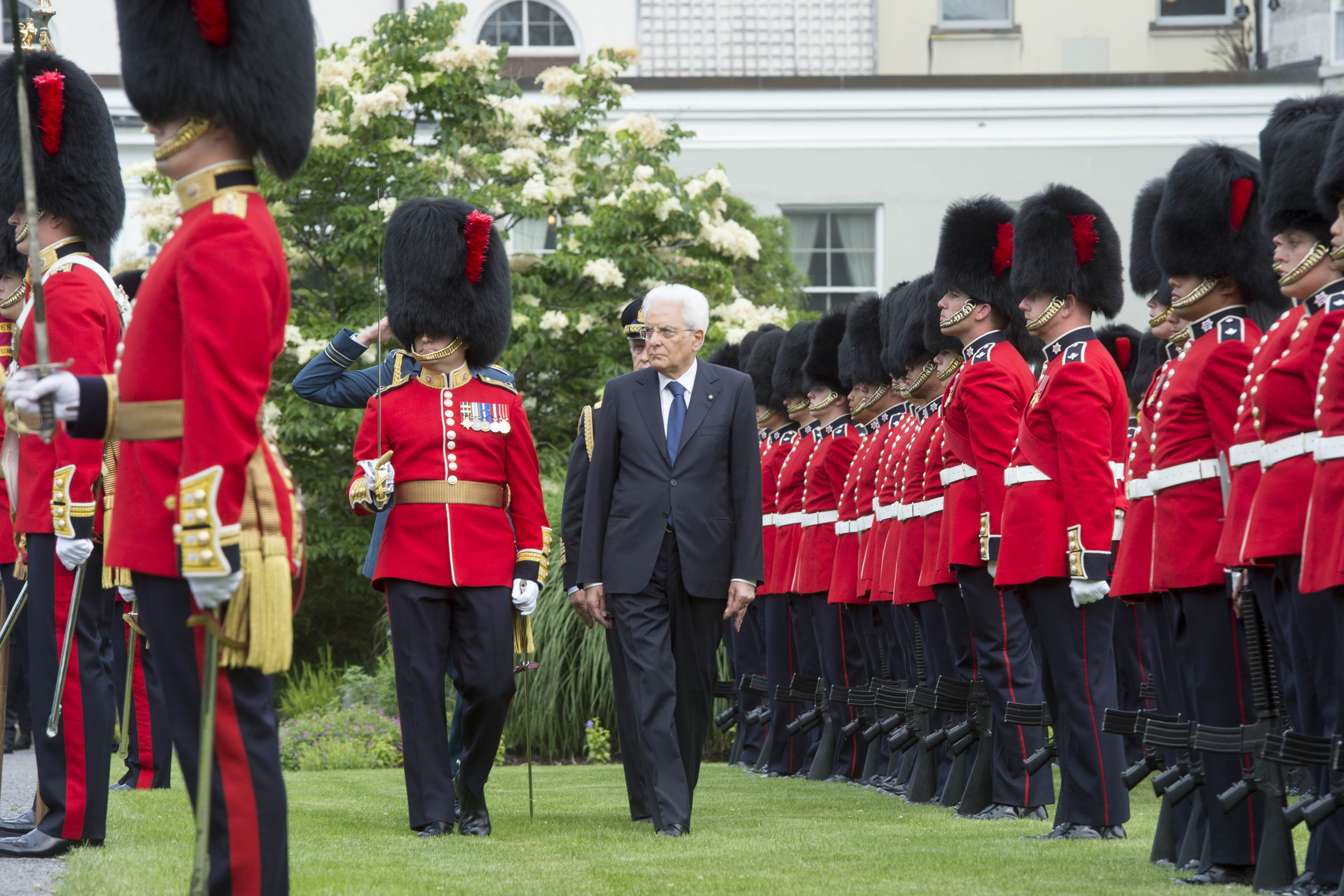
Members of the Governor General's Foot Guards, 2017
Units outside the Commonwealth

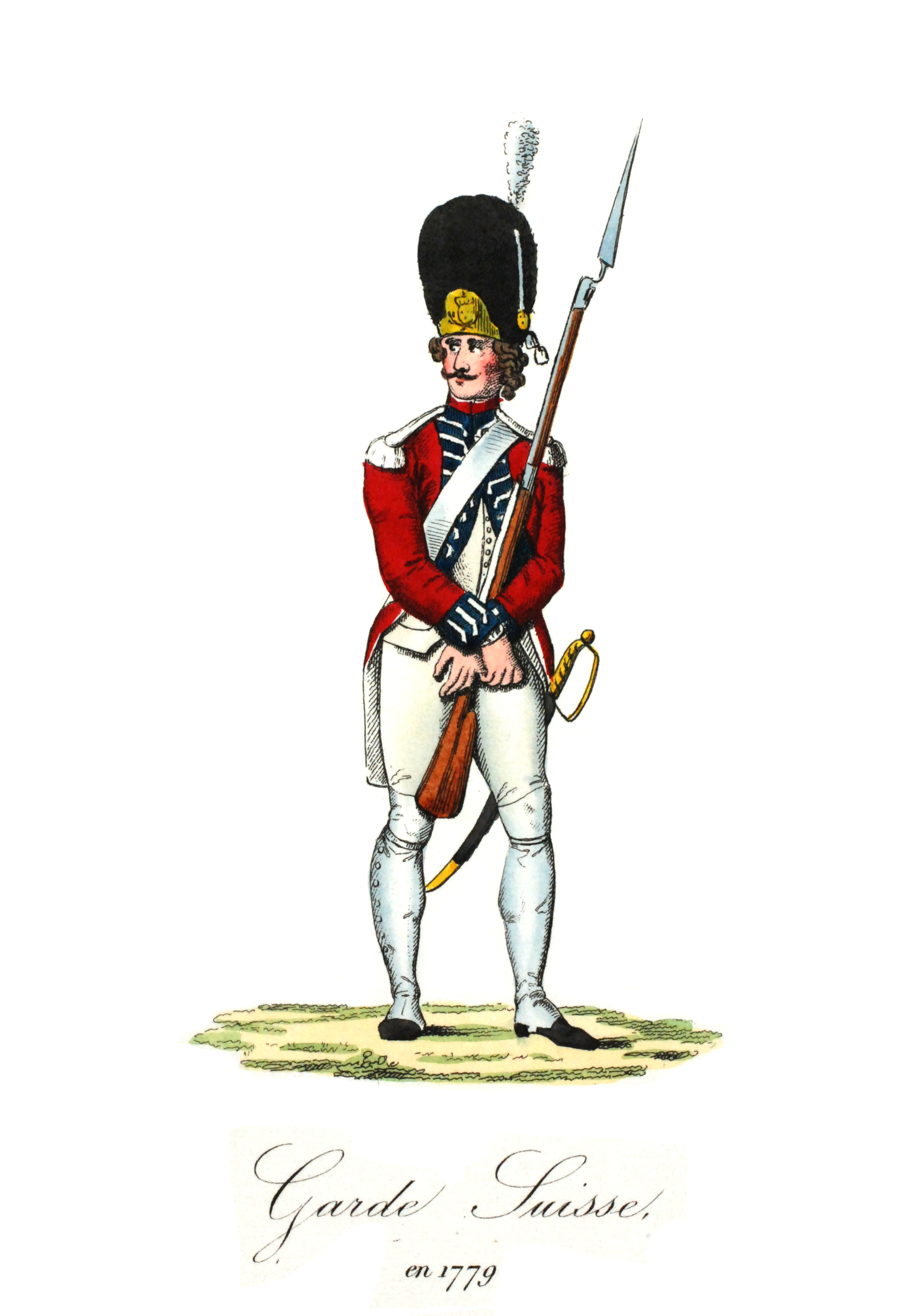
Grenadier of the French Royal Army's Swiss Guards, 1779

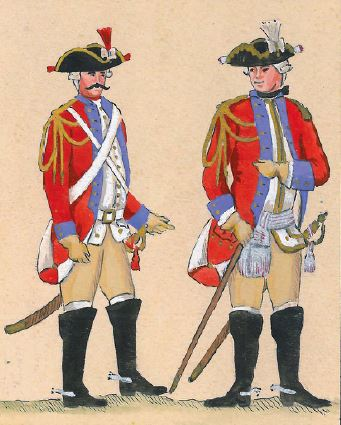
Soldier and officer of the Grand Ducal Lithuanian Army's 63rd Life Dragoons Regiment, which formed part of the army's Royal Guards, 1775

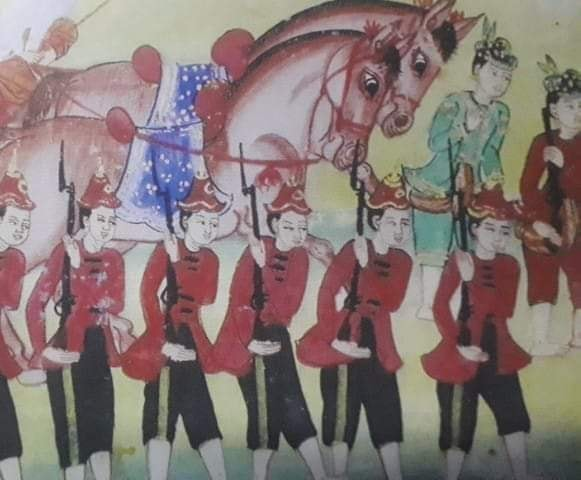
Royal guards of the Royal Burmese armed forces

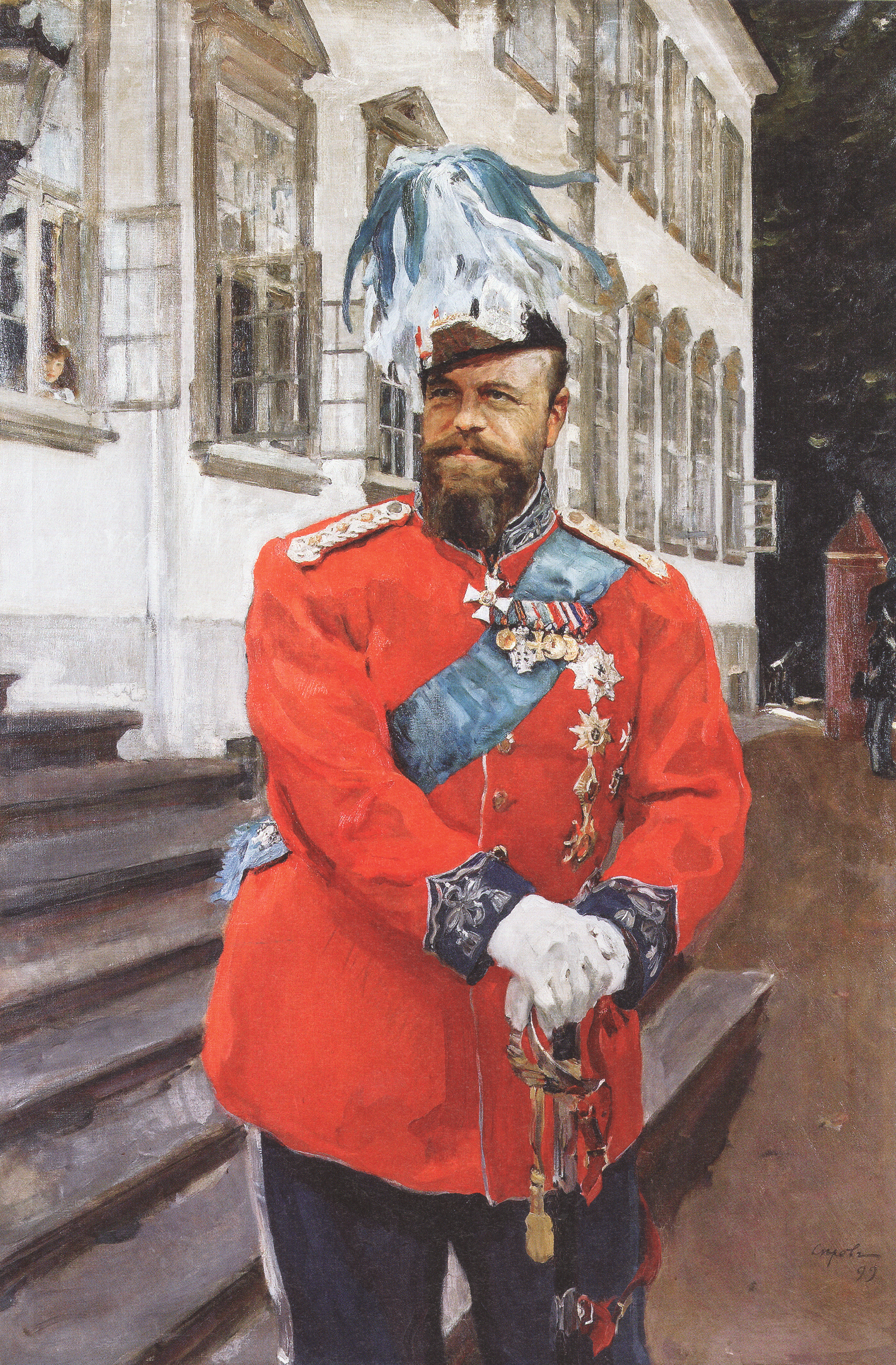
Alexander III in the uniform of the Royal Danish Army's Royal Life Guards, 1899

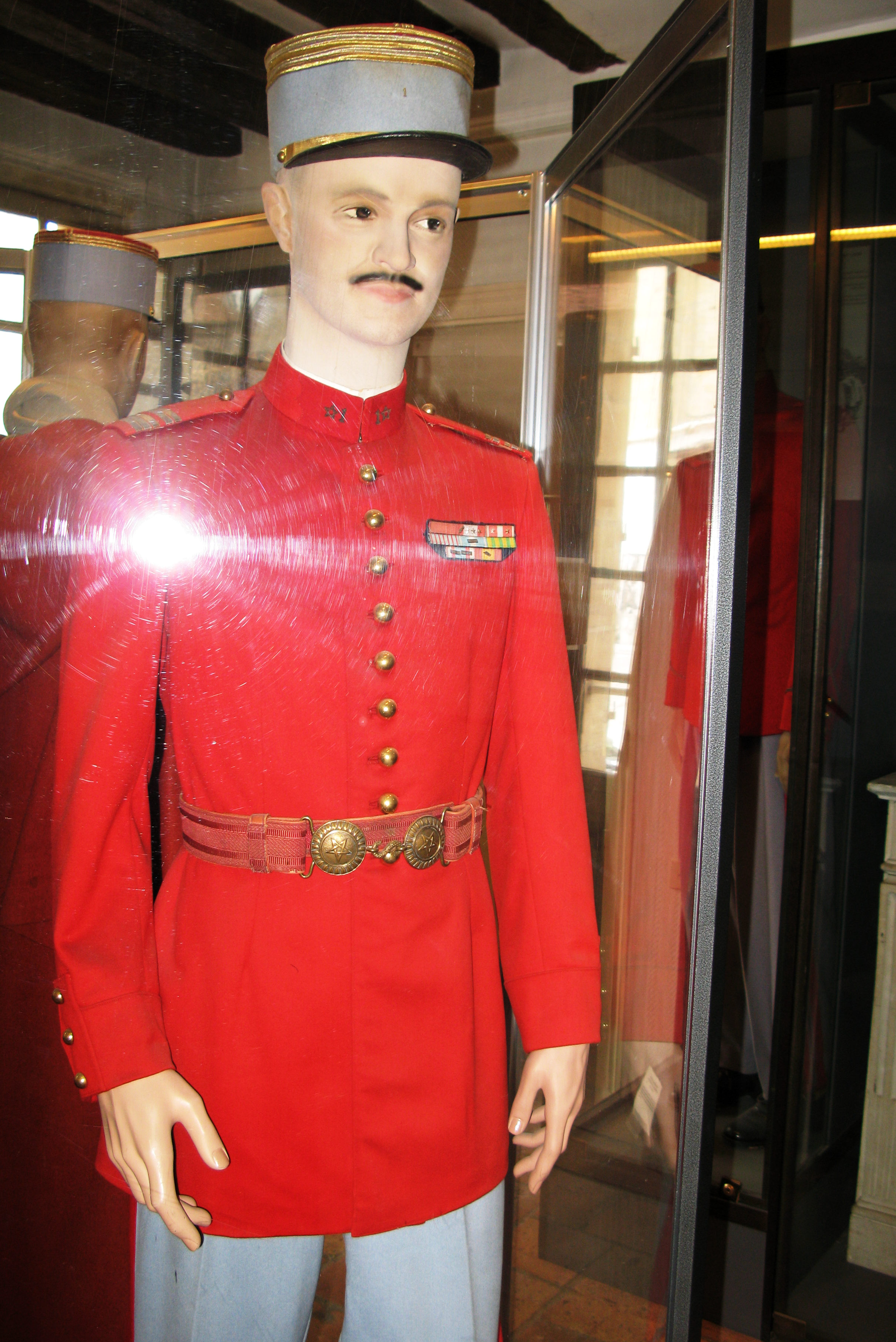
Uniform of a French officer in the Army of Africa's Spahi units, c. 1919–1939

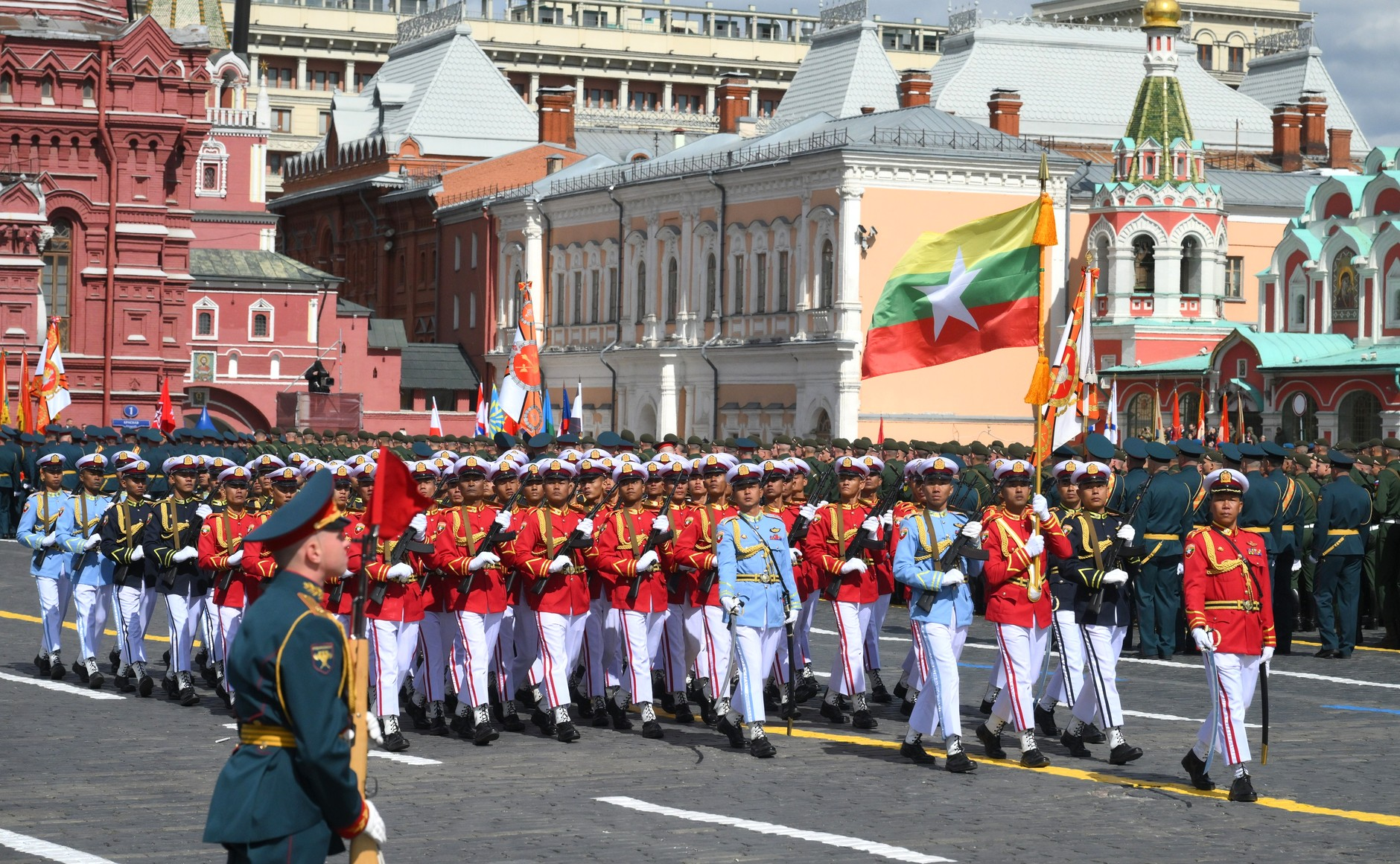
Myanmar Army in Red Uniforms during the 2025 Moscow Victory Parade

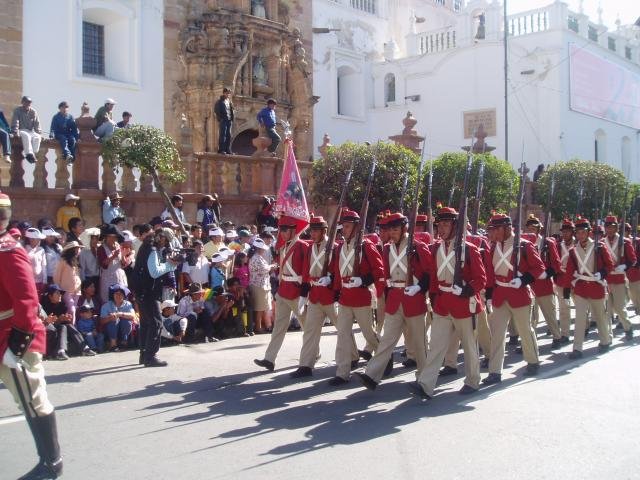
Soldiers of the Bolivian Colorados Regiment during a parade in Sucre, 2005

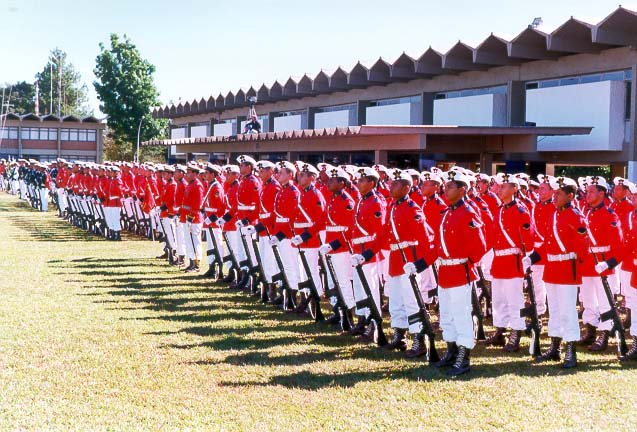
Graduating Brazilian Marine Corps recruits, 2008

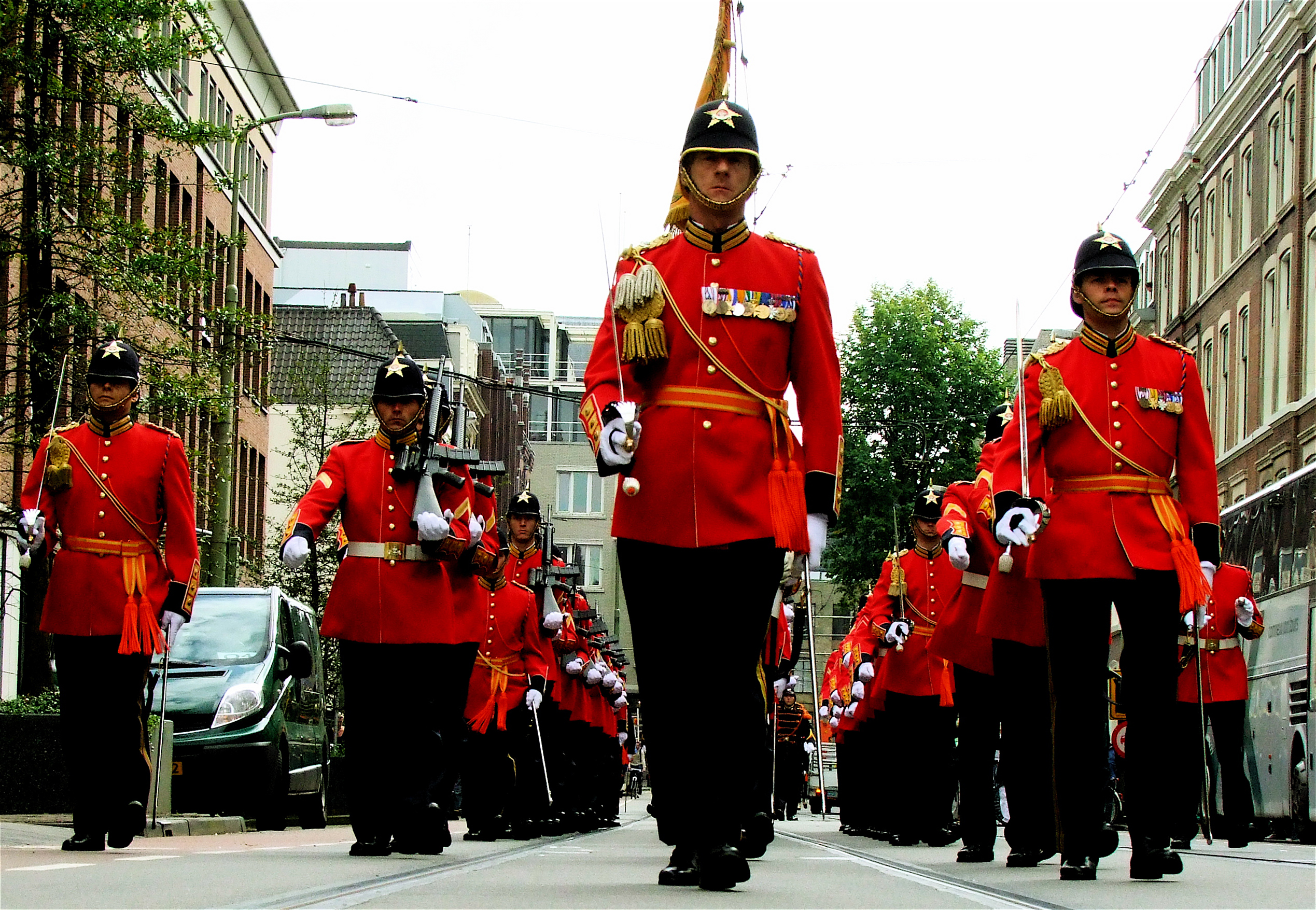
Troops of the Garderegiment Fuseliers Prinses Irene, 2008

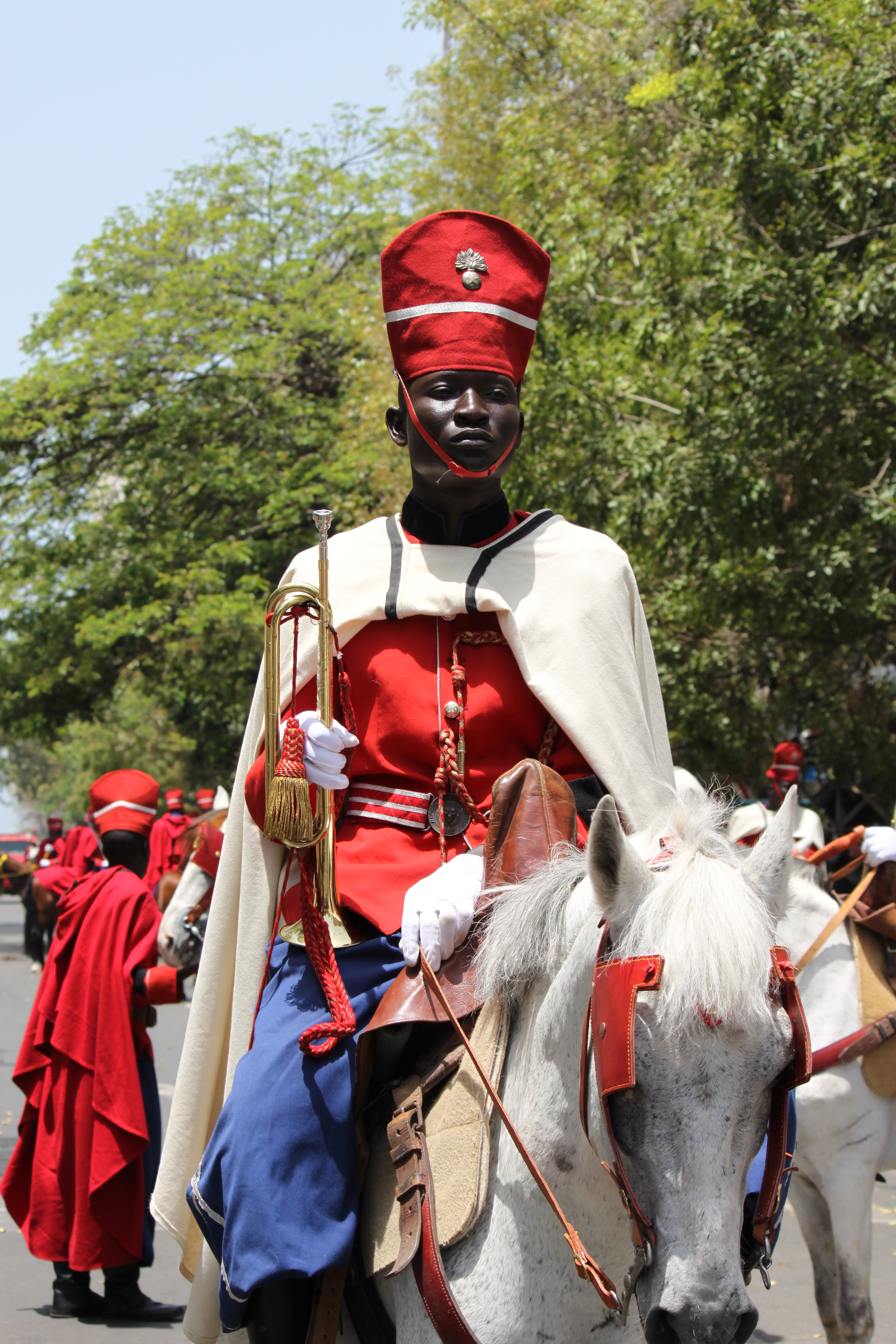
Soldier of the Red Guard of Senegal, 2012

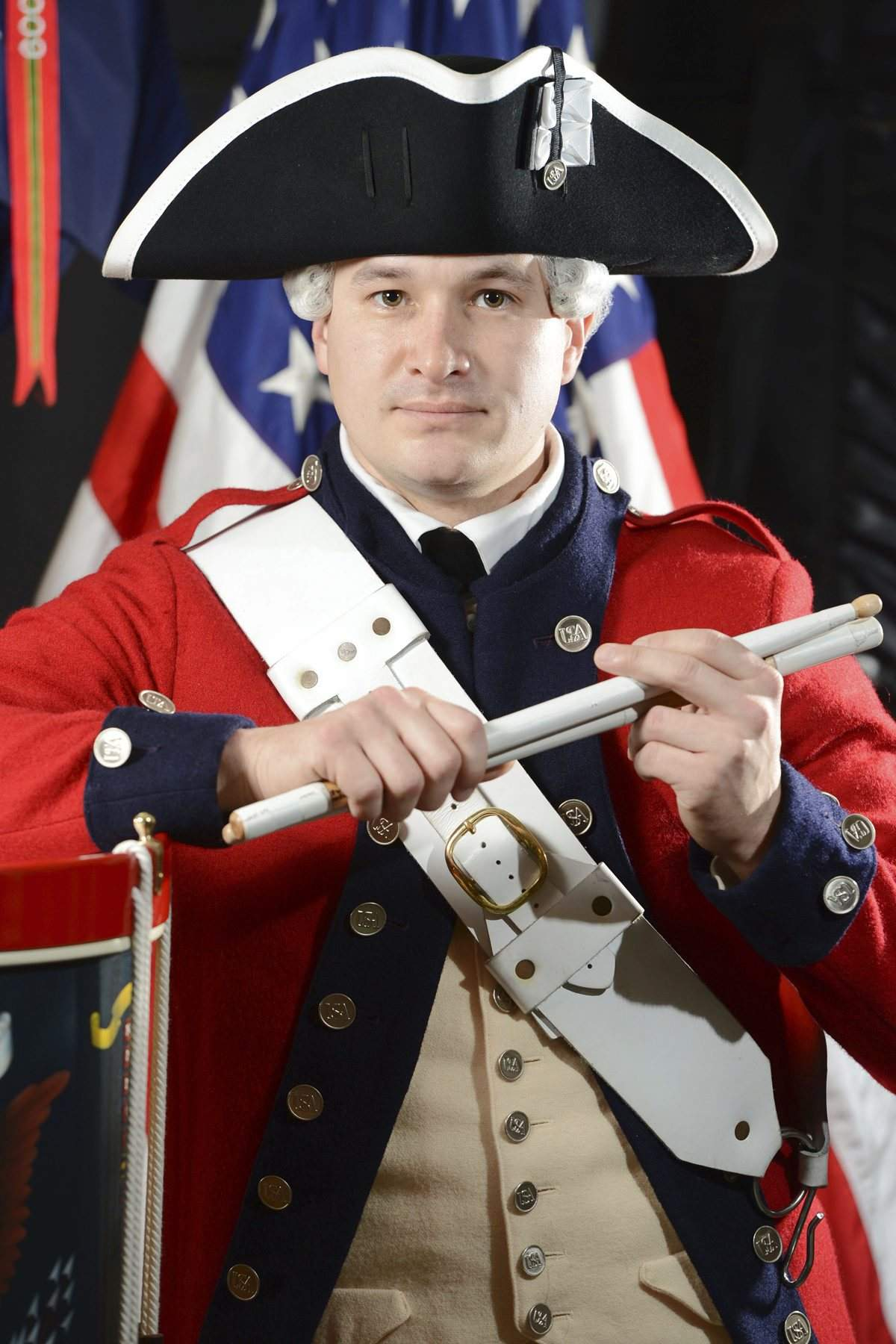
Drummer of the Old Guard Fife and Drum Corps, 2013

== See also ==
- The Thin Red Line (Battle of Balaclava)

== Sources ==
- Barnes, Major R. M. (1951). History of the Regiments & Uniforms of the British Army. Seeley Service & Co.
- Barthorp, Michael (1982). British Infantry Uniforms Since 1660. Blandford Press. ISBN 978-1-85079-009-9.
- Carman, W.Y. (1957). British Military Uniforms from Contemporary Pictures. Feltham Middlesex: Hamlyn Publishing Group.
- Carman, W.Y. (1968). British Military Uniforms from Contemporary Pictures. Hamlyn Publishing Group.
- Carman, W.Y. (n.d.). British Military Uniforms from Contemporary Pictures. Hamlyn Publishing Group.
- Carman, W.Y.; Simkin, Richard (1985). Uniforms of the British Army — the Infantry Regiments. Exeter: Webb & Bower. ISBN 978-0-86350-031-2.
- Fraser, Edward; Carr-Laughton, L. G. (1930). The Royal Marine Artillery 1804-1923, Volume 1 [1804-1859]. London: The Royal United Services Institution. OCLC 4986867.
- Kannik, Preben (1968). Military Uniforms of the World in Colour. Blandford Press. ISBN 0-71370482-9.
- Lawson, Cecil C. P. (1969) [1940]. A History of the Uniforms of the British Army, Volume I: From the Beginning to 1760. London: Kaye & Ward. ISBN 978-0-7182-0814-1.
- Mollo, John (1972). Military Fashion. Barrie and Jenkins. ISBN 978-0-214-65349-0.
- Stadden, Charles C. (1997). Uniforms of the Royal Marines. The Pompadour Gallery. ISBN 0-9519342-2-8.
- Young, Peter; Holmes, Richard (27 September 1999). The English Civil War. Wordsworth Editions. ISBN 978-1-84022-222-7.
