= List of titles and honours of Beatrix of the Netherlands =

Royal styles of Princess Beatrix of the Netherlands
- Reference style: Her Royal Highness
- Spoken style: Your Royal Highness

Beatrix of the Netherlands has held numerous titles and honours, both during, before, and after her reign, including a number of historical titles.

== Royal and noble titles and styles ==
- 31 January 1938 – 30 April 1980: Her Royal Highness Princess Beatrix of the Netherlands, Princess of Orange-Nassau, Princess of Lippe-Biesterfeld
- 30 April 1980 – 30 April 2013: Her Majesty The Queen
- 30 April 2013 – present: Her Royal Highness Princess Beatrix of the Netherlands, Princess of Orange-Nassau, Princess of Lippe-Biesterfeld

Beatrix's full regnal title was:

Beatrix, by the Grace of God, Queen of the Netherlands, Princess of Orange-Nassau, Princess of Lippe-Biesterfeld, Lady of Amsberg, Marquise of Veere and Flushing, Countess of Katzenelnbogen, Vianden, Diez, Spiegelberg, Buren, Leerdam and Culemborg, Burgravine of Antwerp, Baroness of Breda, Diest, Beilstein, the town of Grave and the lands of Cuyk, IJsselstein, Cranendonk, Eindhoven, Liesveld, Herstal, Warneton, Arlay and Nozeroy, Hereditary and Free Lady of Ameland, Lady of Borculo, Bredevoort, Lichtenvoorde, Het Loo, Geertruidenberg, Clundert, Zevenbergen, Hooge and Lage Zwaluwe, Naaldwijk, Polanen, St Maartensdijk, Soest, Baarn, Ter Eem, Willemstad, Steenbergen, Montfort, St Vith, Bütgenbach, Dasburg, Niervaart, Turnhout and Besançon

It was usually shortened to: "Beatrix, by the Grace of God, Queen of the Netherlands, Princess of Orange-Nassau, etc, etc, etc."

== Dutch honours ==
=== National honours ===
Country	Date	Honour	Ribbon
The Netherlands	31 January 1956 – 30 April 1980	Knight Grand Cross of the Order of the Netherlands Lion	
The Netherlands	30 April 2013 – present	Knight Grand Cross of the Order of the Netherlands Lion	
The Netherlands	30 April 1980 – 30 April 2013	Grand Master of the Military Order of William	
The Netherlands	30 April 1980 – 30 April 2013	Grand Master and Knight Grand Cross of the Order of the Netherlands Lion	
The Netherlands	30 April 1980 – 30 April 2013	Grand Master of the Order of Orange-Nassau	

=== House honours ===
Country	Date	Honour	Ribbon
The Netherlands; Luxembourg	30 April 1980 – 30 April 2013	Joint Grand Master of the Order of the Gold Lion of the House of Nassau	
The Netherlands	30 April 1980 – 30 April 2013	Grand Master of the Order of the House of Orange	
The Netherlands	30 April 1980 – 30 April 2013	Grand Master of the Order for Loyalty and Merit	
The Netherlands	30 April 1980 – 30 April 2013	Grand Master of the Order of the Crown	

=== Other honours ===
Country	Date	Honour	Ribbon
The Netherlands	1959	Honorary Commander of the Order of Saint John in the Netherlands	
The Netherlands		Patron of the Bailiwick of Utrecht of the Teutonic Order	
The Netherlands	30 April 1980 – 30 April 2013	Grand Master of the Order of the Golden Ark	

=== Honorary degree ===
- Netherlands: Doctor honoris causa of the Leiden University, 8 February 2005

== Foreign honours, decorations and awards ==
=== Foreign honours ===
Country	Date	Honour	Ribbon	Post-nominal letters
United Kingdom	1958	Honorary Dame Grand Cross of the Royal Victorian Order		GCVO
Sovereign Military Order of Malta	1960	Dame Grand Cross of Honour and Devotion of the Sovereign Military Order of Malta		
Thailand	1960	Dame of the Most Illustrious Order of the Royal House of Chakri		MChK
Austria	1961	Grand Star of the Decoration of Honour for Services to the Republic of Austria		
Norway	1964	Grand Cross with Collar of the Royal Norwegian Order of Saint Olav		
Denmark	29 October 1975	Knight of the Order of the Elephant		RE
Sweden	6 October 1976	Member with Collar of the Royal Order of the Seraphim		LSerafO
Philippines	1979	Member of the Order of Gabriela Silang		
Spain	1980	Dame Grand Cross of the Royal Order of Isabella the Catholic		GYC
Germany	1 March 1983	Grand Cross Special Class of the Order of Merit of the Federal Republic of Germany		
Italy	1985	Knight Grand Cross with Collar of the Order of Merit of the Italian Republic		OMRI
Spain	1985	Lady of the Distinguished Order of the Golden Fleece		
United Kingdom	1989	Stranger Lady of the Most Noble Order of the Garter		LG
Portugal	14 May 1991	Grand Collar of the Order of Prince Henry		GColIH
South Africa	1996	Grand Cross of the Order of Good Hope		
Romania	2001	Collar of the Order of the Star of Romania		
Brazil	2003	Grand Collar of the National Order of the Southern Cross		
Thailand	2003	Dame of the Most Auspicious Order of the Rajamitrabhorn		RMBh
Latvia	17 May 2006	Commander Grand Cross with Collar of the Order of Three Stars		
Slovakia	2007	Member 1st Class of the Order of the White Double Cross		
Estonia	2008	Collar of the Order of the Cross of Terra Mariana		
Ghana	2008	Companion of the Order of the Star of Ghana		CSG
Lithuania	2008	Order of Vytautas the Great with the Golden Chain		
Mexico	2009	Collar of the Mexican Order of the Aztec Eagle		
Oman	2012	Collar of the Order of Al Said		
Turkey	2012	Order of the State of Republic of Turkey		
United Arab Emirates	2012	Collar of the Order of Zayed		
Brunei	2013	Recipient of the Royal Family Order of the Crown of Brunei		DKMB
Belgium		Grand Cordon of the Order of Leopold		
Bulgaria		Order of the Balkan Mountains with Sash		
Chile		Collar of the Order of the Merit		
(Ethiopia) Ethiopian Empire		Dame Grand Cordon of the Order of the Queen of Sheba		
Finland		Grand Cross with Collar of the Order of the White Rose of Finland		
France		Grand Cross of the National Order of the Legion of Honour		
Kingdom of Greece		Dame Grand Cross of the Royal Order of Saints Olga and Sophia, Special Class		
Greece		Grand Cross of the Order of the Redeemer		
Iceland		Collar with Grand Cross Breast Star of the Order of the Falcon		
Indonesia		Star of the Republic of Indonesia, First Class		
Indonesia		Star of Mahaputera, First Class		
Imperial State of Iran		Member 1st Class of the Order of the Pleiades		
Ivory Coast		Grand Cross of the National Order of the Ivory Coast		
Japan		Collar of the Order of the Chrysanthemum		
Jordan		Collar of the Order of Al-Hussein bin Ali		
Liberia		Grand Cordon of the Grand Order of the Most Venerable Order of the Knighthood of the Pioneers of the Republic of Liberia		
Luxembourg		Knight of the Order of the Gold Lion of the House of Nassau		
Luxembourg		Grand Cross of the Order of Civil and Military Merit of Adolph of Nassau		
Luxembourg		Grand Cross of the Order of the Oak Crown		
Peru		Grand Cross of the Order of the Sun of Peru		
Poland		Knight of the Order of the White Eagle		
Qatar		Member Grand Cordon with Collar of the Order of Independence of the State of Qatar		
Senegal		Grand Cross of the National Order of the Lion		
Suriname		Grand Cordon of the Honorary Order of the Yellow Star		
Tunisia		Grand Cordon of the Order of the Republic		
Venezuela		Grand Collar of the Order of the Liberator		
Socialist Federal Republic of Yugoslavia		Grand Cross of the Order of the Yugoslav Star		

=== Foreign decorations ===
Country	Date	Decoration	Ribbon
Sweden	30 April 1996	King Carl XVI Gustaf's Jubilee Commemorative Medal	
Sweden	30 April 2016	King Carl XVI Gustaf's Jubilee Commemorative Medal III	
United Kingdom	1982	Royal Victorian Chain	

=== Foreign awards ===
Country	Date	Award
Germany	16 May 1996	Charlemagne Prize
