= Order for Loyalty and Merit =

Order for Loyalty and Merit Orde van Trouw en Verdienste
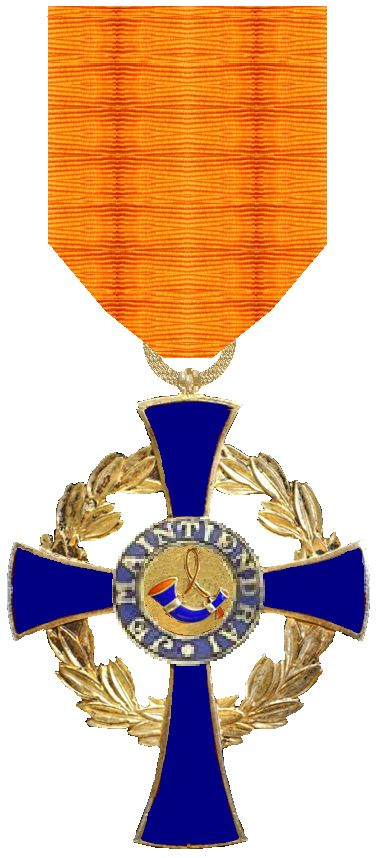
- Cross in Gold of the Order for Loyalty and Merit

Awarded by the King of the Netherlands
- Type: House Order
- Established: 30 November 1969
- Motto: JE MAINTIENDRAI
- Awarded for: Those persons who have loyally and faithfully, and with merit and character assisted the Head of State or the members of the Royal House during their obligations and their daily work.
- Status: Currently constituted
- Grand Master: King Willem-Alexander
- Chancellor: Jaap Leeuwenburg
- Grades: Cross for Loyalty and Merit in gold and silver

Precedence
- Next (higher): Order of the Gold Lion of the House of Nassau
- Next (lower): Honorable Mention, Bronze Lion
- Equivalent: Order of the House of Orange, Order of the Crown
- Ribbon bar of the Order for Loyalty and Merit

The Order for Loyalty and Merit (Dutch: Orde van Trouw en Verdienste) is a house order of the Dutch Royal House of Orange-Nassau. The Order came into being as a result of Queen Juliana's reorganization of The House Order of Orange (Huisorde van Oranje) in 1969.

The Order for Loyalty and Merit is conferred "upon those persons who have loyally and faithfully, and with merit and character assisted the Head of State or the members of the Royal House during their obligations and their daily work."

The order has two grades:

1. Cross for Loyalty and Merit in Gold;
2. Cross for Loyalty and Merit in Silver.

The cross in gold or silver is worn on a ribbon on the left chest. The decorations are awarded after 25 and 40 years of service. The monarch is lenient as far as the number of years in his service are concerned. Hardly anyone manages to work until his or her 65th birthday. Many servants of the King receive their Cross of merit for Loyalty and Merit in Gold after 35 years in the Royal Household.
