= Order of the Crown (Netherlands) =

Dutch house order

Order of the Crown Kroonorde
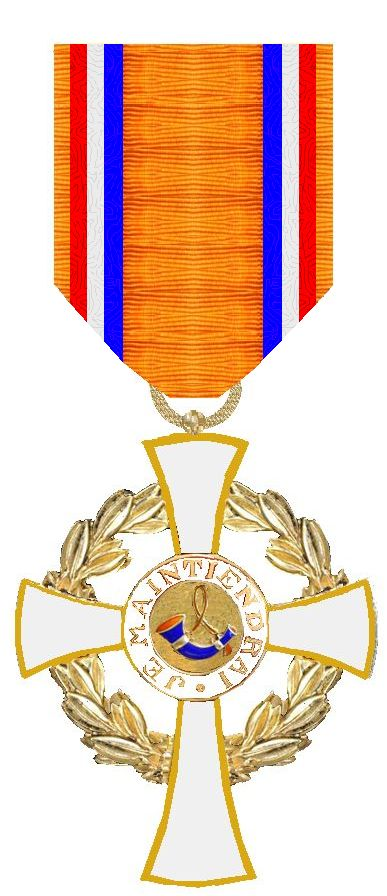
- Cross of honour of the Order of the Crown

Awarded by King of the Netherlands
- Type: House Order
- Established: 30 November 1969
- Motto: JE MAINTIENDRAI
- Eligibility: Foreigners
- Awarded for: Special service to the Dutch Sovereign or Royal House
- Status: Currently constituted
- Sovereign: King Willem-Alexander
- Chancellor: Jaap Leeuwenburg
- Grades: Grand Cross; Grand Honorary Cross with Star; Grand Honorary Cross; Honorary Cross with Rosette; Honorary Cross; Medal in Gold; Medal in Silver; Medal in Bronze

Precedence
- Next (higher): Order of the Gold Lion of the House of Nassau
- Next (lower): Honorable Mention, Bronze Lion
- Equivalent: Order of the House of Orange, Order for Loyalty and Merit
- Ribbon bar of the Order of the Crown

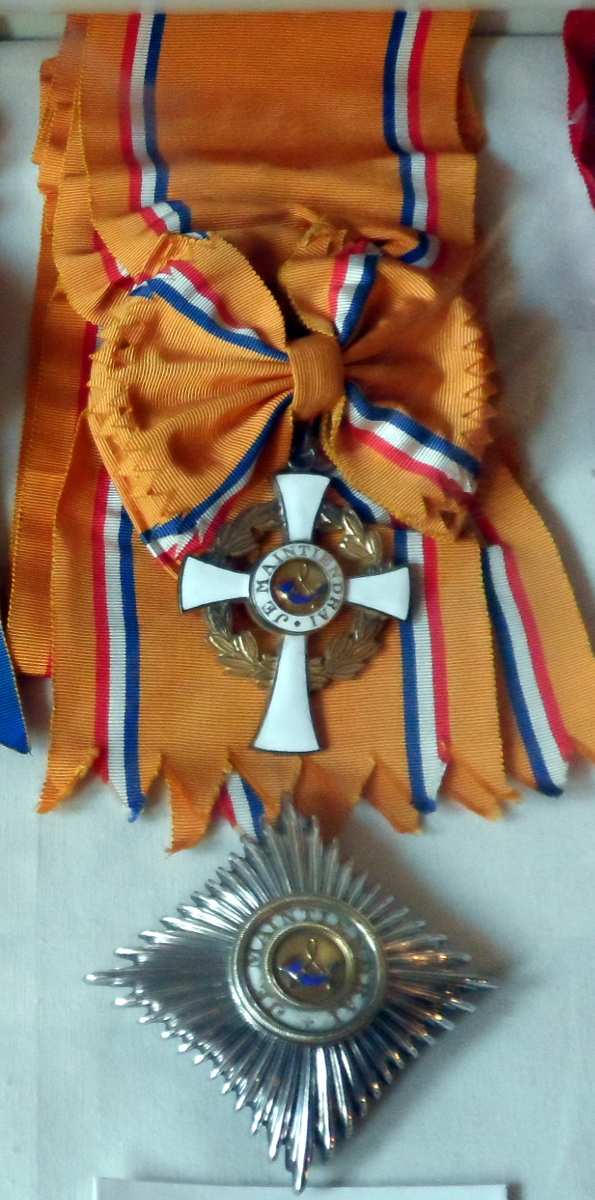
Sash with badge and star of the grade Grand Cross

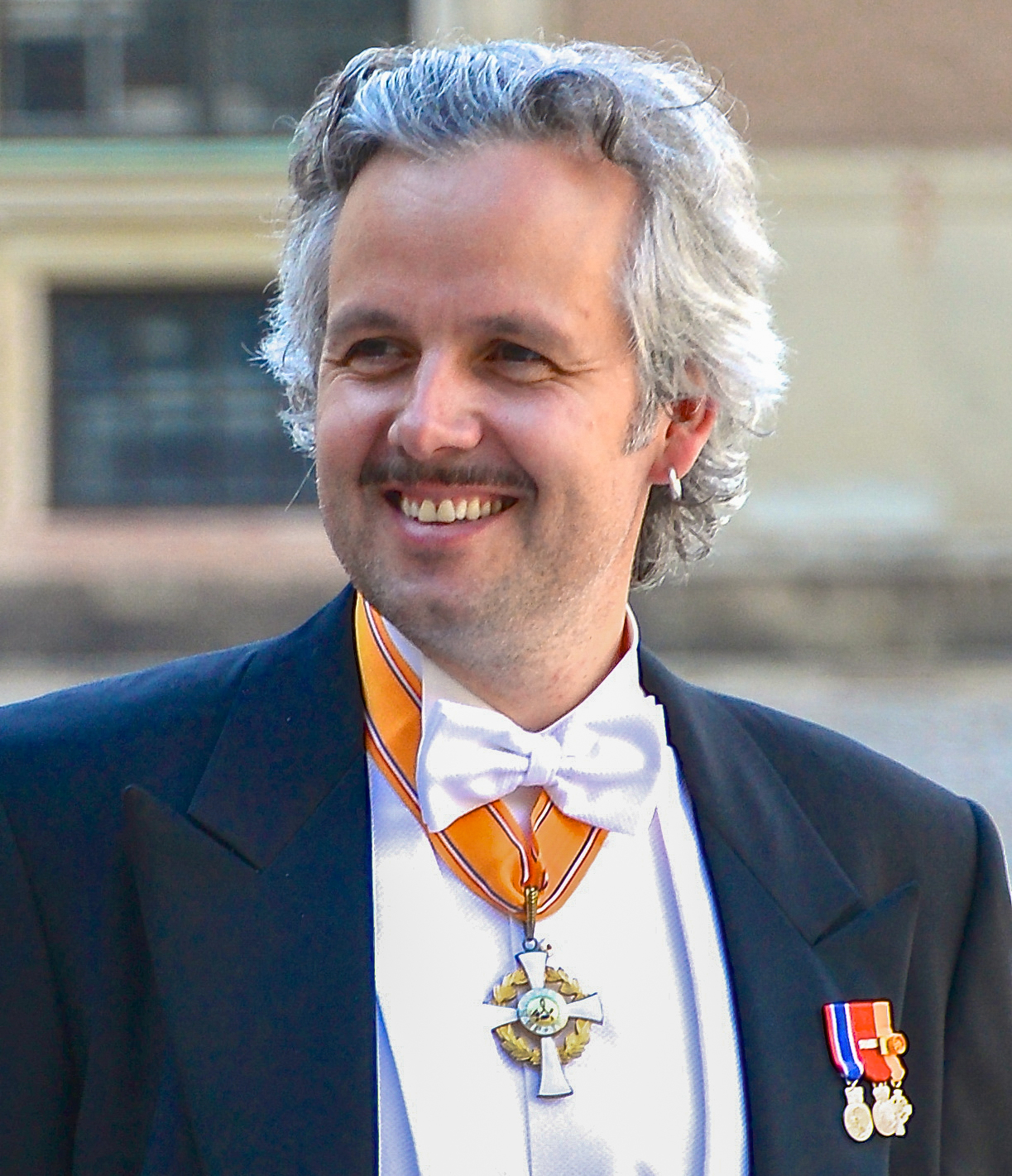
The late Ari Behn in 2013, wearing the badge of the Order on a necklet (his accompanying Star is not shown).

The Order of the Crown (Dutch: Kroonorde) is a house order of the Dutch Royal House. The order came into being as a result of Queen Juliana's reorganization of the Order of the House of Orange (Huisorde van Oranje) in 1969. The 18 classes of the house order were no longer felt to be appropriate in the ever more egalitarian Dutch society of the 1960s. The Order was divided into five subdivisions. As a house order it is not subject to ministerial responsibility or influence, but is awarded at the discretion of the Dutch monarch alone.

The Order of the Crown is intended for "foreigners who have rendered special service to the Dutch King or his House". The former queen, Beatrix, instituted a silver medal to commemorate state visits.

== Grades and insignia ==
The Order of the Crown has the traditional five grades and three medals. This allows the Dutch monarch to dispense the decorations according to rank especially during state visits. The following five grades and medals with insignia:

1. Grand Cross (Grootkruis) - badge may be worn on a sash on the right shoulder, plus a 4-pointed star on the left chest;
2. Grand Honorary Cross with Star (Groot erekruis met Plaque) - wears the badge on a necklet, plus a 4-pointed star on the left chest;
3. Grand Honorary Cross (Groot erekruis) - wears the badge on a necklet;
4. Honorary Cross with Rosette (Erekruis met Rozette) - wears the badge on a ribbon with a rosette on the left chest;
5. Honorary Cross (Erekruis) - wears the badge on a ribbon on the left chest;
6. Medals in Gold, Silver and Bronze (Medaille in goud, zilver en brons) - wears the medal on a ribbon on the left chest.

Ribbon bars of the Order of the Crown
| Grand Cross | Grand Honorary Cross with Star | Grand Honorary Cross |
| Honorary Cross with Rosette | Honorary Cross | |
| Gold medal | Silver medal | Bronze medal |

== List of current members Grand Cross ==
- Charles III of the United Kingdom, then the Prince of Wales (1972)
- Princess Alexandra, The Honourable Lady Ogilvy (1982)
- Henri, Grand Duke of Luxembourg
- Maria Teresa, Grand Duchess of Luxembourg
- Princess Benedikte of Denmark (1984)
- Queen Sonja of Norway (1986)
- Princess Astrid of Norway, Mrs. Ferner (1986)
- Emperor Naruhito of Japan, then Crown Prince (1991)
- Pakualam VIII, Duke of Pakualaman
- Princess Astrid of Norway (1996)
- Princess Martha Louise of Norway (1996)
- King Rama X, then Crown Prince of Thailand (2004)
- Princess Sirindhorn of Thailand (2004)
- Princess Astrid of Belgium, Archduchess of Austria-Este (2006)
- Princess Claire of Belgium (2006)
- Prince Laurent of Belgium (2006)
- Prince Lorenz of Belgium, Archduke of Austria-Este (2006)
- Eva Köhler (2007)
- Alma Adamkienė (2008)
- Hayrünnisa Gül (2012)
- Al-Muhtadee Billah, Crown Prince of Brunei (2013)
- Pengiran Anak Sarah, Crown Princess of Brunei (2013)

=== By decree of King Willem-Alexander ===
- Queen Letizia of Spain (2014)
- Empress Masako (2014)
- Prince Akishino, Crown Prince of Japan (2014)
- Princess Kiko, Crown Princess of Japan (2014)
- Prince Joachim of Denmark (2015)
- Princess Marie of Denmark (2015)
- Juliana Awada (2017)
- Iveta Vējone (2018)
- Georgi-Rene Maksimovski (2018)
- Lígia Fonseca (2018)
- Elke Büdenbender (2021)
- Doris Schmidauer (2022)
- Prince Daniel, Duke of Västergötland (2022)
- Prince Carl Philip, Duke of Värmland (2022)
- Princess Sofia, Duchess of Värmland (2022)
- Princess Christina, Mrs. Magnuson (2022)
- Laura Mattarella (2022)
- Suzanne Innes-Stubb (2025)
