= Houten train accident =

1917 derailment in the Netherlands

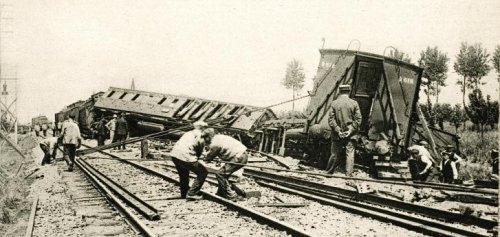

- Location within Netherlands

Details
- Date: 7 June 1917
- Location: Houten
- Coordinates: 52°00′28″N 5°11′9″E
- Country: Netherlands
- Operator: Maatschappij tot Exploitatie van Staatsspoorwegen
- Incident type: Derailment
- Cause: Heat caused the rails to expand

Statistics
- Trains: 1
- Injured: 11

A railway accident between Houten and Schalkwijk occurred in the Netherlands on 7 June 1917 around 4:11 pm Amsterdam time. The locomotive and the first eight coaches were detached from the rest of the train and came to a standstill. Eleven coaches derailed, including one that rolled off the embankment, causing enormous damage. 11 people were injured. Queen Wilhelmina, who was in the train, was unharmed in the accident.

The cause of the derailment was heat: the outside temperature was about 30 degrees Celsius causing expansion of the rails. It was named a "slap in the track". During the evening and night, soldiers who were stationed in the area helped to release one of the two tracks.

The train included two royal coaches. These coaches were at the rear of the train and only the first one derailed. The Queen had made a two-day visit to the Zaltbommel region and was on her way home to The Hague via Utrecht. She helped with taking care of the injured people, being described as calm, and responding professionally. After 20 minutes to half an hour there was no more help needed and the Queen went on by train to Utrecht. At various royal palaces across the country, registers opened on the day after the accident that subjects could use to sign a congratulations to the Queen for the good outcome.

== Gallery ==
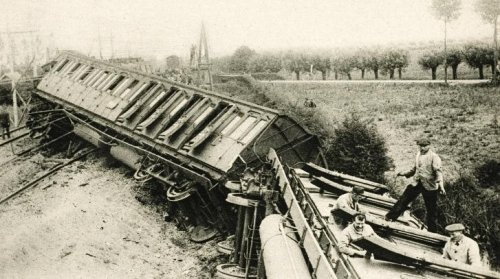

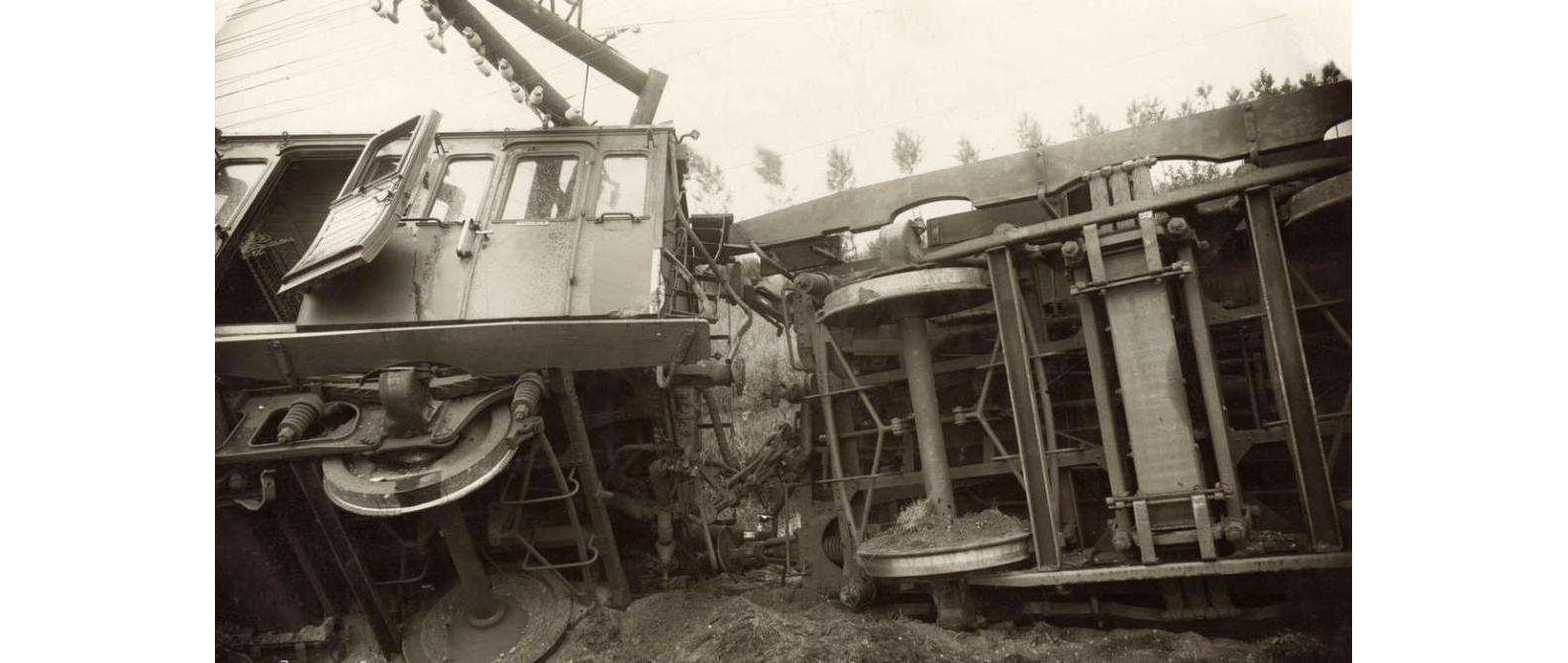

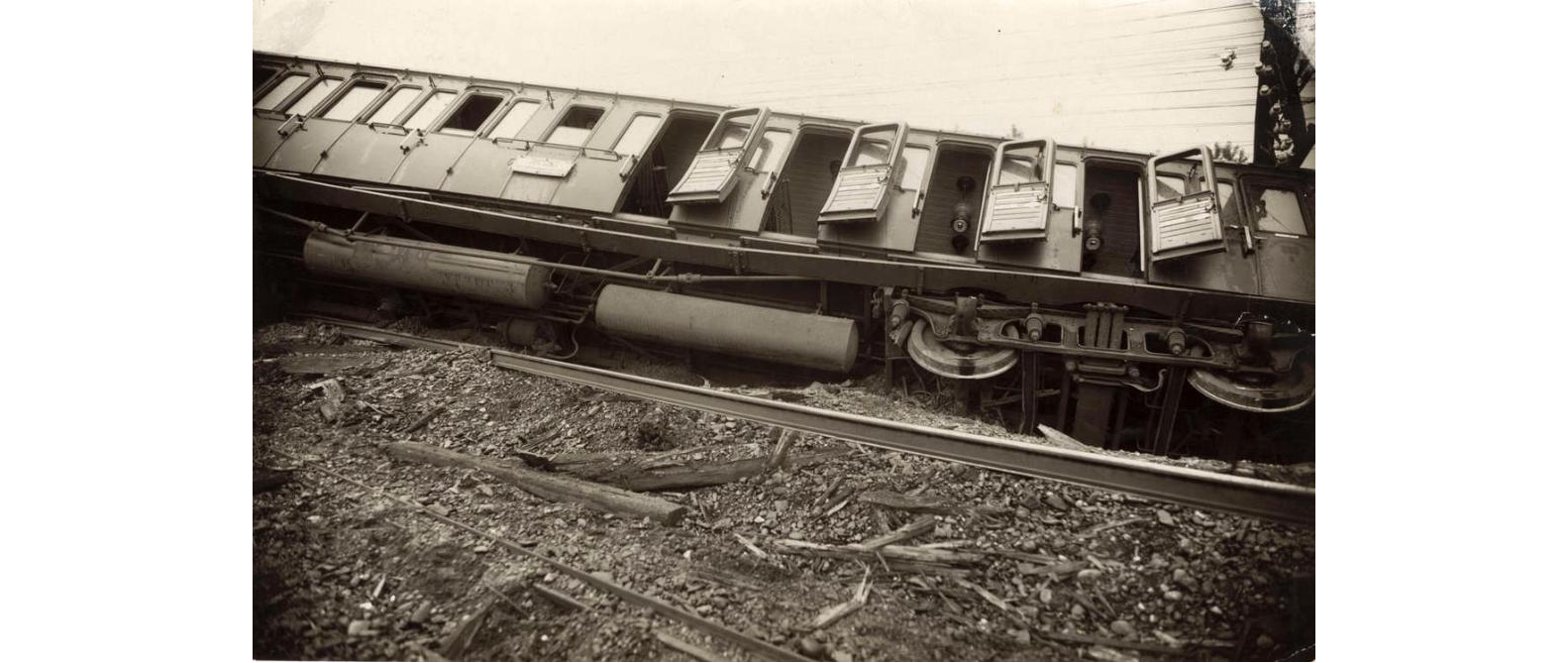
