= Honorable Mention =

Former military award of the Kingdom of the Netherlands

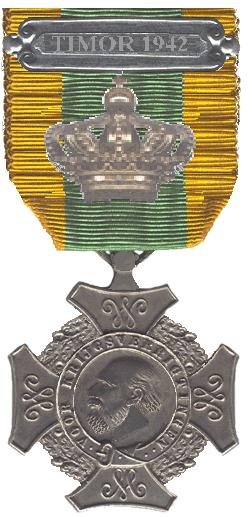
- The Crown of Honorable Mention on the Decoration for Important Military Acts.
- Type: Military award
- Awarded for: Exceptional display of bravery, but not yet eligible yet for the highest Military William Order
- Presented by: Kingdom of the Netherlands
- Status: Obsolete, replaced by the Bronze Lion
- First award: 30 April 1815
- Final award: 30 March 1944

Highlights
- Total: 4146
- Total awarded posthumously: Posthumous awards were possible
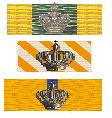
- The Crown of Honorable Mention on different ribbon bars

Precedence
- Next (higher): Order of the House of Orange
- Equivalent: Bronze Lion
- Next (lower): Resistance Star East Asia

The Honorable Mention was an important military decoration of the Kingdom of the Netherlands for those who distinguished themselves by acts of high bravery, but were not eligible yet for the highest accolade of the Military William Order. The Honorable Mention was in fact not a medal but a mention in the proclamation of the Dutch army, to honor the soldier.

Since the mention was important in the process to be made an actual knight of the Military William Order, the Honorable Mentions were registered in the chapter of the Military William Order.

In the first instance no decoration was associated with this Honorable Mention, although unofficially soldiers used a small decorative metal wreath worn above their other decorations and medals. These decorative wreaths are primarily known to be used during the Ten days campaign (August 2–12, 1831) and the Java War (1825–1830).

In 1877 King William III decided by royal decree that soldiers with an Honorable Mention were allowed to wear a silver crown on the ribbon or ribbon bar of the Dutch "Decoration for Important Military Acts" as decoration, together with a Roman numeral in case of multiple mentions. Hundreds of soldiers in the former Netherlands East Indies were awarded with these Honorable Mentions.

Shortly before the start of the Second World War the law regarding the Military William Order was reorganized, and as result that the Honorable Mention was abolished. Although the mention didn't have an official status anymore since then, on the ribbon or ribbon bars of the Bronze Cross or the Airman's Cross still a decorative crown for Honorable Mention was worn, however now in gold.

With the royal decree on 30 March 1944 Queen Wilhelmina created the Bronze Lion as high bravery award and finally replaced the Honorable Mention.
