= Bronze Cross (Netherlands) =

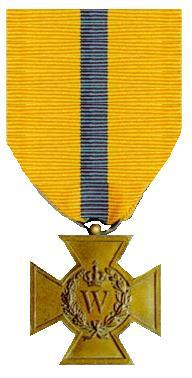
- Type: Military award
- Awarded for: Acts of courage and leadership in the face of the enemy.
- Description: The medal is a bronze cross pattée. A wreath consisting of tendrils of oak and laurel leaves is tied around the royal cypher. The orange ribbon has a Nassau blue stripe in the center. Orange is the colour of the Queen, the head of the House of Orange, and blue is the heraldic colour of the ancestral house of Nassau.
- Presented by: Kingdom of the Netherlands
- Eligibility: Military Personnel, merchant navy and civilians in the resistance
- Campaigns: World War II and later campaigns
- Clasps: none; if the cross is awarded again a large Arabic golden figure "2" or "3" is attached to the ribbon.
- Status: Currently awarded
- First award: 11 June 1940
- Final award: On 7 October 2009 to 1st Lt Alex Spanhak for his actions in Afghanistan

Highlights
- Total: 3,501
- Total awarded posthumously: Posthumous awards are possible
- Ribbon bar of the Bronze Cross

Precedence
- Next (higher): Resistance Star East Asia
- Next (lower): Cross of Merit

The Bronze Cross of the Kingdom of the Netherlands (Dutch: "Het Bronzen Kruis") was instituted on 11 June 1940 by Queen Wilhelmina of the Netherlands while she was residing in London during the German occupation of the Netherlands. The Bronze Cross has precedence after the Resistance Star East Asia, but is the third highest military decoration still being awarded for bravery.

Several British, American, Canadian and Polish soldiers are among the 3,501 recipients of the Bronze Cross that is awarded by Royal Decree.
