= Resistance Star East Asia =

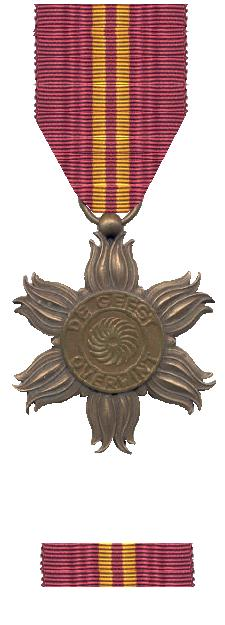
- The Resistance Star East Asia with corresponding ribbon bar.
- Type: Civil decoration
- Awarded for: Dutch subjects in the Netherlands East Indies who showed praiseworthily help for Dutchmen interned by the enemy during World War II. Also for Dutch resistance in Southeast Asia.
- Presented by: Kingdom of the Netherlands
- Status: Still living recipients, but not awarded anymore
- Established: 26 October 1948

Highlights
- Total: 471

Precedence
- Next (higher): Honorable Mention, Bronze Lion
- Next (lower): Bronze Cross

The Resistance Star East Asia (Dutch: Verzetsster Oost-Azië) was created by royal decree on 26 October 1948 by Queen Juliana to honor those Dutch subjects in the Netherlands East Indies who showed strength of mind, determination, or solidarity, and performed praiseworthily help for Dutchmen that were made prisoner of war or interned by the enemy during World War II. Also those of the Dutch resistance in Southeast Asia are honored.

The star commemorates the resistance against the Japanese occupation of the Dutch East Indies, which went underground after the capitulation of the Royal Dutch East Indies Army. This resistance suffered tremendous losses of life.

The bronze six-pointed star with a flaming sun and the words "de geest overwint" (English: the spirit triumphs) was designed by Frans Smits. The star is attached to a purple ribbon which has two golden lanes in the middle. The colours are symbolic: the gold-yellow remembers the custom in Southeast Asia to wrap a valuable gift in a gold-coloured cloth. at the reverse side the text "maart 1942 - O.Azië - augustus 1945" (English: "March 1942 - East Asia - August 1945") is inscribed.

Due to the loss of the archive of the Resistance Star a lot of historiography about the award is lost.

Since 1948, the Resistance Star has been awarded 471 times. The star is a high award and has precedence just after the Bronze Lion.

== Sources ==
- M. Spaans Azn., De geest overwint. De verzetsster Oost-Azië 1942-1945 [2004]
