= Style of the Dutch sovereign =

The obverse Dutch inscription reads WILLEM III KONING DER NED[ERLANDEN] G[ROOT] H[ERTOG] V[AN] L[UXEMBURG], meaning "William III, King of the Netherlands, Grand Duke of Luxembourg".

The style of the Dutch sovereign has changed many times since the establishment of the Kingdom of the Netherlands due to formations and dissolutions of personal unions, as well as due to marriages of female sovereigns and cognatic successions.

== History ==
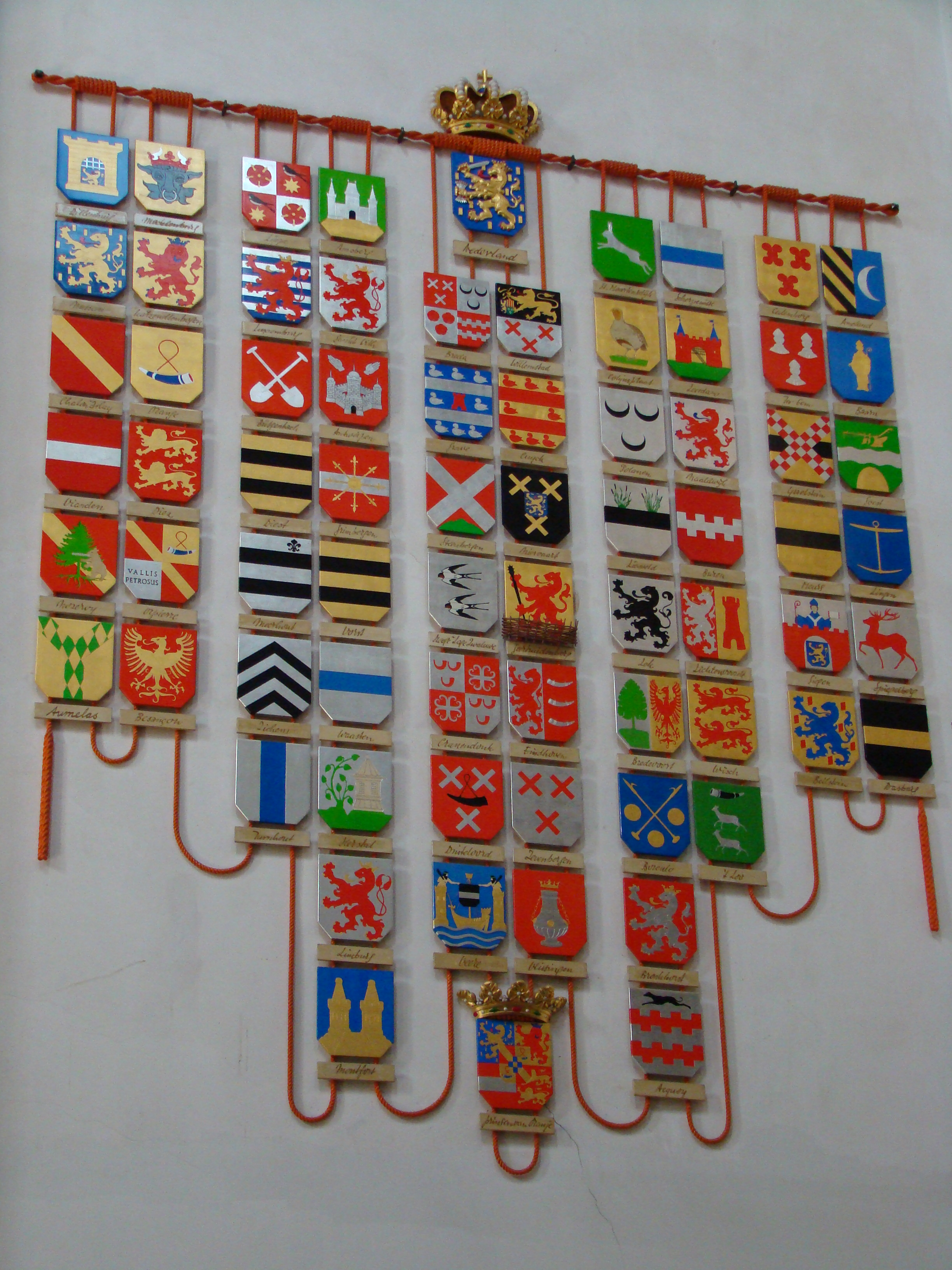
Coats of arms corresponding to the titles borne by various Dutch monarchs, displayed at Nieuwe Kerk in Amsterdam

The Kingdom of the Netherlands was proclaimed on 16 March 1815, as a state in personal union with the Grand Duchy of Luxembourg under William I, a member of the House of Orange-Nassau who had already inherited a vast number of titles and lands from his ancestors. On 19 April 1839, the Duchy of Limburg joined the union. William I, William II and William III all ruled as kings, grand dukes and dukes.

In 1866, however, the Duchy of Limburg ceased to exist as a separate polity and instead became integrated into the Kingdom of the Netherlands as a province. William III kept the ducal title and passed it on to his successor, Wilhelmina, but she did not succeed him to the throne of Luxembourg, as the country's succession laws provided for strict observance of Salic law. Thus, the reference to the Grand Duchy of Luxembourg disappeared from the style of the Dutch monarch.

The male line of the House of Orange-Nassau ended with the death of William III on 23 November 1890. His only surviving child and successor, Wilhelmina, married Duke Henry of Mecklenburg-Schwerin on 7 February 1901 and, as customary, assumed the feminine form of her husband's title. The title of duchess of Mecklenburg was thus added to her full style. The government did not want the House of Orange-Nassau to become extinct on Wilhelmina's death, and so in 1908 she issued a royal decree conferring the title of prince or princess of Orange-Nassau to her descendants. Her only child, Juliana, was therefore born not only duchess of Mecklenburg but also princess of Orange-Nassau, like previous members of the Dutch royal family.

When Juliana married Prince Bernhard of Lippe-Biesterfeld in 1936, Wilhelmina decreed that her daughter and heir presumptive would assume the title of princess of Lippe-Biesterfeld as customary, but that it would come after her birth title of duchess of Mecklenburg. On 4 September 1948, Wilhelmina abdicated in favour of Juliana, which brought the title of princess of Lippe-Biesterfeld into the full style of the Dutch monarch. At the same time, the title of duchess of Limburg was dropped, Wilhelmina being the last person to hold it.

Like Wilhelmina, Juliana had no sons. She abdicated in favour of Beatrix, the eldest of her four daughters, on 30 April 1980. Beatrix is not a male-line descendant of Duke Henry and thus not a duchess of Mecklenburg. She was the first Dutch monarch in 79 years not to bear the title. Through her father, she is a princess of Lippe-Biesterfeld.

On 30 April 2013, she abdicated in favour of her eldest son, Willem-Alexander, who thus became the first male on the throne in 123 years. He is not a male-line descendant of Prince Bernhard and thus not a prince of Lippe-Biesterfeld. He bears the honorific jonkheer van Amsberg as the son of Claus van Amsberg.

== Full styles ==
Period	Full style in Dutch	Full style in English	Sovereign
16 March 1815 – 19 April 1839	Bij de Gratie Gods, Koning der Nederlanden, Prins van Oranje-Nassau, Groothertog van Luxemburg, Markies van Veere en Vlissingen, Graaf van Katzenelnbogen, Vianden, Diez, Spiegelberg, Buren, Leerdam en Culemborg, Burggraaf van Antwerpen, Baron van Breda, Diest, Beilstein, de Stad Grave, het Land van Cuyk, IJsselstein, Cranendonck, Eindhoven, Liesveld, Herstal, Warneton, Arlay en Nozeroy, Erf- en Vrijheer van Ameland, Heer van Borculo, Bredevoort, Lichtenvoorde, Het Loo, Geertruidenberg, Clundert, Zevenbergen, Hooge en Lage Zwaluwe, Naaldwijk, Polanen, Sint-Maartensdijk, Soest, Baarn, Ter Eem, Willemstad, Steenbergen, Montfort, Sankt Vith, Burgenbach, Daasburg, Niervaart, Turnhout en Besançon	By the Grace of God, King of the Netherlands, Prince of Orange-Nassau, Grand Duke of Luxembourg, Marquis of Veere and Flushing, Count of Katzenelnbogen, Vianden, Diez, Spiegelberg, Buren, Leerdam and Culemborg, Burgrave of Antwerp, Baron of Breda, Diest, Beilstein, the town of Grave and the lands of Cuyk, IJsselstein, Cranendonk, Eindhoven, Liesveld, Herstal, Warneton, Arlay and Nozeroy, Hereditary and Free Lord of Ameland, Lord of Borculo, Bredevoort, Lichtenvoorde, Het Loo, Geertruidenberg, Clundert, Zevenbergen, Hooge and Lage Zwaluwe, Naaldwijk, Polanen, St Maartensdijk, Soest, Baarn, Ter Eem, Willemstad, Steenbergen, Montfort, St Vith, Bütgenbach, Dasburg, Niervaart, Turnhout and Besançon	William I
19 April 1839 – 23 November 1890	Bij de Gratie Gods, Koning der Nederlanden, Prins van Oranje-Nassau, Groothertog van Luxemburg, Hertog van Limburg, Markies van Veere en Vlissingen, Graaf van Katzenelnbogen, Vianden, Diez, Spiegelberg, Buren, Leerdam en Culemborg, Burggraaf van Antwerpen, Baron van Breda, Diest, Beilstein, de Stad Grave, het Land van Cuyk, IJsselstein, Cranendonck, Eindhoven, Liesveld, Herstal, Warneton, Arlay en Nozeroy, Erf- en Vrijheer van Ameland, Heer van Borculo, Bredevoort, Lichtenvoorde, Het Loo, Geertruidenberg, Clundert, Zevenbergen, Hooge en Lage Zwaluwe, Naaldwijk, Polanen, Sint-Maartensdijk, Soest, Baarn, Ter Eem, Willemstad, Steenbergen, Montfort, Sankt Vith, Bütgenbach, Daasburg, Niervaart, Turnhout en Besançon	By the Grace of God, King of the Netherlands, Prince of Orange-Nassau, Grand Duke of Luxembourg, Duke of Limburg, Marquis of Veere and Flushing, Count of Katzenelnbogen, Vianden, Diez, Spiegelberg, Buren, Leerdam and Culemborg, Burgrave of Antwerp, Baron of Breda, Diest, Beilstein, the town of Grave and the lands of Cuyk, IJsselstein, Cranendonk, Eindhoven, Liesveld, Herstal, Warneton, Arlay and Nozeroy, Hereditary and Free Lord of Ameland, Lord of Borculo, Bredevoort, Lichtenvoorde, Het Loo, Geertruidenberg, Clundert, Zevenbergen, Hooge and Lage Zwaluwe, Naaldwijk, Polanen, St Maartensdijk, Soest, Baarn, Ter Eem, Willemstad, Steenbergen, Montfort, St Vith, Bütgenbach, Dasburg, Niervaart, Turnhout and Besançon	William I, William II, William III
23 November 1890 – 7 February 1901	Bij de Gratie Gods, Koningin der Nederlanden, Prinses van Oranje-Nassau, Hertogin van Limburg, Markiezin van Veere en Vlissingen, Gravin van Katzenelnbogen, Vianden, Diez, Spiegelberg, Buren, Leerdam en Culemborg, Burggravin van Antwerpen, Barones van Breda, Diest, Beilstein, de Stad Grave, het Land van Cuyk, IJsselstein, Cranendonck, Eindhoven, Liesveld, Herstal, Warneton, Arlay en Nozeray, Erf- en Vrijvrouwe van Ameland, Vrouwe van Borculo, Bredevoort, Lichtenvoorde, Het Loo, Geertruidenberg, Clundert, Zevenbergen, Hooge en Lage Zwaluwe, Naaldwijk, Polanen, Sint-Maartensdijk, Soest, Baarn, Ter Eem, Willemstad, Steenbergen, Montfort, Sankt Vith, Bütgenbach, Daasburg, Niervaart, Turnhout en Besançon	By the Grace of God, Queen of the Netherlands, Princess of Orange-Nassau, Duchess of Limburg, Marquise of Veere and Flushing, Countess of Katzenelnbogen, Vianden, Diez, Spiegelberg, Buren, Leerdam and Culemborg, Burgravine of Antwerp, Baroness of Breda, Diest, Beilstein, the town of Grave and the lands of Cuyk, IJsselstein, Cranendonk, Eindhoven, Liesveld, Herstal, Warneton, Arlay and Nozeroy, Hereditary and Free Lady of Ameland, Lady of Borculo, Bredevoort, Lichtenvoorde, Het Loo, Geertruidenberg, Clundert, Zevenbergen, Hooge and Lage Zwaluwe, Naaldwijk, Polanen, St Maartensdijk, Soest, Baarn, Ter Eem, Willemstad, Steenbergen, Montfort, St Vith, Bütgenbach, Dasburg, Niervaart, Turnhout and Besançon	Wilhelmina
7 February 1901 – 4 September 1948	Bij de Gratie Gods, Koningin der Nederlanden, Prinses van Oranje-Nassau, Hertogin van Limburg, Hertogin van Mecklenburg, Markiezin van Veere en Vlissingen, Gravin van Katzenelnbogen, Vianden, Diez, Spiegelberg, Buren, Leerdam en Culemborg, Burggravin van Antwerpen, Barones van Breda, Diest, Beilstein, de Stad Grave, het Land van Cuyk, IJsselstein, Cranendonck, Eindhoven, Liesveld, Herstal, Warneton, Arlay en Nozeray, Erf- en Vrijvrouwe van Ameland, Vrouwe van Borculo, Bredevoort, Lichtenvoorde, Het Loo, Geertruidenberg, Clundert, Zevenbergen, Hooge en Lage Zwaluwe, Naaldwijk, Polanen, Sint-Maartensdijk, Soest, Baarn, Ter Eem, Willemstad, Steenbergen, Montfort, Sankt Vith, Bütgenbach, Daasburg, Niervaart, Turnhout en Besançon	By the Grace of God, Queen of the Netherlands, Princess of Orange-Nassau, Duchess of Limburg, Duchess of Mecklenburg, Marquise of Veere and Flushing, Countess of Katzenelnbogen, Vianden, Diez, Spiegelberg, Buren, Leerdam and Culemborg, Burgravine of Antwerp, Baroness of Breda, Diest, Beilstein, the town of Grave and the lands of Cuyk, IJsselstein, Cranendonk, Eindhoven, Liesveld, Herstal, Warneton, Arlay and Nozeroy, Hereditary and Free Lady of Ameland, Lady of Borculo, Bredevoort, Lichtenvoorde, Het Loo, Geertruidenberg, Clundert, Zevenbergen, Hooge and Lage Zwaluwe, Naaldwijk, Polanen, St Maartensdijk, Soest, Baarn, Ter Eem, Willemstad, Steenbergen, Montfort, St Vith, Bütgenbach, Dasburg, Niervaart, Turnhout and Besançon	Wilhelmina
4 September 1948 – 30 April 1980	Bij de Gratie Gods, Koningin der Nederlanden, Prinses van Oranje-Nassau, Hertogin van Mecklenburg, Prinses van Lippe-Biesterfeld, Markiezin van Veere en Vlissingen, Gravin van Katzenelnbogen, Vianden, Diez, Spiegelberg, Buren, Leerdam en Culemborg, Burggravin van Antwerpen, Barones van Breda, Diest, Beilstein, de Stad Grave, het Land van Cuyk, IJsselstein, Cranendonck, Eindhoven, Liesveld, Herstal, Warneton, Arlay en Nozeray, Erf- en Vrijvrouwe van Ameland, Vrouwe van Borculo, Bredevoort, Lichtenvoorde, Het Loo, Geertruidenberg, Clundert, Zevenbergen, Hooge en Lage Zwaluwe, Naaldwijk, Polanen, Sint-Maartensdijk, Soest, Baarn, Ter Eem, Willemstad, Steenbergen, Montfort, Sankt Vith, Bütgenbach, Daasburg, Niervaart, Turnhout en Besançon	By the Grace of God, Queen of the Netherlands, Princess of Orange-Nassau, Duchess of Mecklenburg, Princess of Lippe-Biesterfeld, Marquise of Veere and Flushing, Countess of Katzenelnbogen, Vianden, Diez, Spiegelberg, Buren, Leerdam and Culemborg, Burgravine of Antwerp, Baroness of Breda, Diest, Beilstein, the town of Grave and the lands of Cuyk, IJsselstein, Cranendonk, Eindhoven, Liesveld, Herstal, Warneton, Arlay and Nozeroy, Hereditary and Free Lady of Ameland, Lady of Borculo, Bredevoort, Lichtenvoorde, Het Loo, Geertruidenberg, Clundert, Zevenbergen, Hooge and Lage Zwaluwe, Naaldwijk, Polanen, St Maartensdijk, Soest, Baarn, Ter Eem, Willemstad, Steenbergen, Montfort, St Vith, Bütgenbach, Dasburg, Niervaart, Turnhout and Besançon	Juliana
30 April 1980 – 30 April 2013	Bij de Gratie Gods, Koningin der Nederlanden, Prinses van Oranje-Nassau, Prinses van Lippe-Biesterfeld, Jonkvrouwe van Amsberg, Markiezin van Veere en Vlissingen, Gravin van Katzenelnbogen, Vianden, Diez, Spiegelberg, Buren, Leerdam en Culemborg, Burggravin van Antwerpen, Barones van Breda, Diest, Beilstein, de Stad Grave, het Land van Cuyk, IJsselstein, Cranendonck, Eindhoven, Liesveld, Herstal, Warneton, Arlay en Nozeray, Erf- en Vrijvrouwe van Ameland, Vrouwe van Borculo, Bredevoort, Lichtenvoorde, Het Loo, Geertruidenberg, Clundert, Zevenbergen, Hooge en Lage Zwaluwe, Naaldwijk, Polanen, Sint-Maartensdijk, Soest, Baarn, Ter Eem, Willemstad, Steenbergen, Montfort, Sankt Vith, Bütgenbach, Daasburg, Niervaart, Turnhout en Besançon	By the Grace of God, Queen of the Netherlands, Princess of Orange-Nassau, Princess of Lippe-Biesterfeld, Lady of Amsberg, Marquise of Veere and Flushing, Countess of Katzenelnbogen, Vianden, Diez, Spiegelberg, Buren, Leerdam and Culemborg, Burgravine of Antwerp, Baroness of Breda, Diest, Beilstein, the town of Grave and the lands of Cuyk, IJsselstein, Cranendonk, Eindhoven, Liesveld, Herstal, Warneton, Arlay and Nozeroy, Hereditary and Free Lady of Ameland, Lady of Borculo, Bredevoort, Lichtenvoorde, Het Loo, Geertruidenberg, Clundert, Zevenbergen, Hooge and Lage Zwaluwe, Naaldwijk, Polanen, St Maartensdijk, Soest, Baarn, Ter Eem, Willemstad, Steenbergen, Montfort, St Vith, Bütgenbach, Dasburg, Niervaart, Turnhout and Besançon	Beatrix
30 April 2013 – present	Bij de Gratie Gods, Koning der Nederlanden, Prins van Oranje-Nassau, Jonkheer van Amsberg, Markies van Veere en Vlissingen, Graaf van Katzenelnbogen, Vianden, Diez, Spiegelberg, Buren, Leerdam en Culemborg, Burggraaf van Antwerpen, Baron van Breda, Diest, Beilstein, de stad Grave, het Land van Cuyk, IJsselstein, Cranendonck, Eindhoven, Liesveld, Herstal, Warneton, Arlay en Nozeroy, Erf- en Vrijheer van Ameland, Heer van Borculo, Bredevoort, Lichtenvoorde, Het Loo, Geertruidenberg, Klundert, Zevenbergen, Hooge en Lage Zwaluwe, Naaldwijk, Polanen, Sint-Maartensdijk, Soest, Baarn, Ter Eem, Willemstad, Steenbergen, Montfort, St. Vith, Bütgenbach, Niervaart, Daasburg, Turnhout en Besançon	By the Grace of God, King of the Netherlands, Prince of Orange-Nassau, Jonkheer van Amsberg, Marquis of Veere and Flushing, Count of Katzenelnbogen, Vianden, Diez, Spiegelberg, Buren, Leerdam and Culemborg, Burgrave of Antwerp, Baron of Breda, Diest, Beilstein, the town of Grave and the lands of Cuyk, IJsselstein, Cranendonk, Eindhoven, Liesveld, Herstal, Warneton, Arlay and Nozeroy, Hereditary and Free Lord of Ameland, Lord of Borculo, Bredevoort, Lichtenvoorde, Het Loo, Geertruidenberg, Clundert, Zevenbergen, Hooge and Lage Zwaluwe, Naaldwijk, Polanen, St Maartensdijk, Soest, Baarn, Ter Eem, Willemstad, Steenbergen, Montfort, St Vith, Bütgenbach, Dasburg, Niervaart, Turnhout and Besançon	Willem-Alexander

== Shortened styles ==
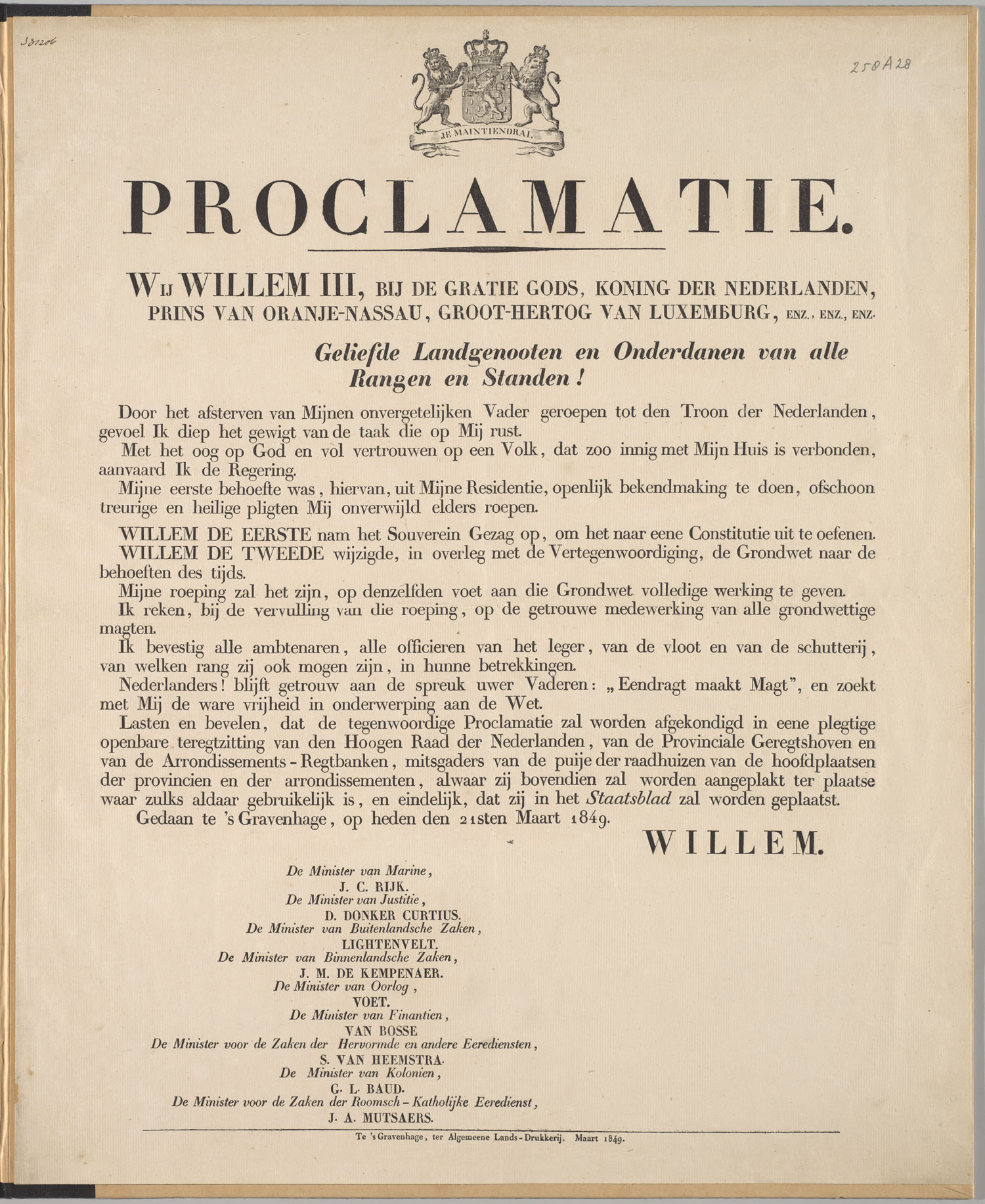
"We, William III, by the Grace of God, King of the Netherlands, Prince of Orange-Nassau, Grand Duke of Luxembourg, etc., etc., etc."

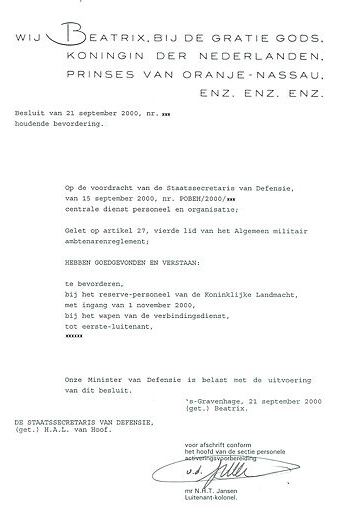
"We, Beatrix, by the Grace of God, Queen of the Netherlands, Princess of Orange-Nassau, etc., etc., etc."

Shortened versions of the styles, used in preambles:

- 1815–1890: By the Grace of God, King of the Netherlands, Prince of Orange-Nassau, Grand Duke of Luxembourg, etc., etc., etc.
- 1890–2013: By the Grace of God, Queen of the Netherlands, Princess of Orange-Nassau, etc., etc., etc.
- 2013–present: By the Grace of God, King of the Netherlands, Prince of Orange-Nassau, etc., etc., etc.

Titles that have appeared in shortened styles, preceded by "His Majesty" or "Her Majesty" and the monarch's name:

- 1815–1890: King of the Netherlands, Prince of Orange-Nassau, Grand Duke of Luxembourg, etc.
- 1890–1901: Queen of the Netherlands, Princess of Orange-Nassau, etc.
- 1901–1948: Queen of the Netherlands, Princess of Orange-Nassau, Duchess of Mecklenburg, etc.
- 1948–1980: Queen of the Netherlands, Princess of Orange-Nassau, Duchess of Mecklenburg, Princess of Lippe-Biesterfeld, etc.
- 1980–2013: Queen of the Netherlands, Princess of Orange-Nassau, Princess of Lippe-Biesterfeld, etc.
- 2013–present: King of the Netherlands, Prince of Orange-Nassau, etc.
