= Order of the House of Orange =

Dynastic order of the House of Orange-Nassau, the royal family of the Netherlands

Order of the House of Orange Huisorde van Oranje
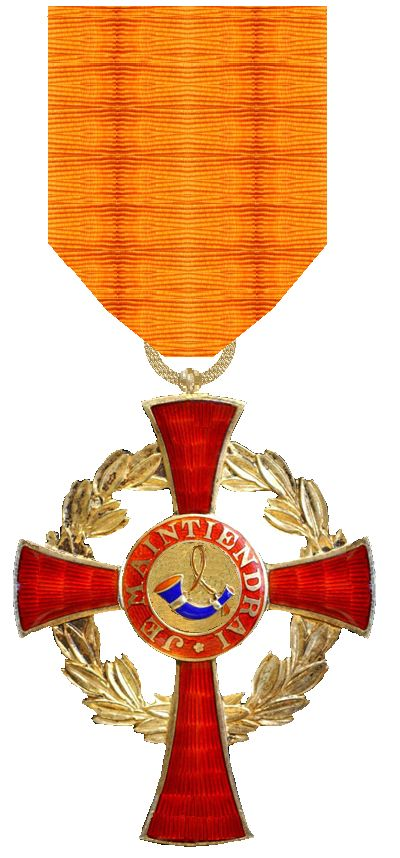
- The Honorary Cross of the Order of the House of Orange

Awarded by King of the Netherlands
- Type: House Order
- Established: 19 March 1905
- Motto: JE MAINTIENDRAI
- Awarded for: persons who have rendered special service to the Royal House
- Status: Currently constituted
- Grand Master: King Willem-Alexander
- Chancellor: Bert Wassenaar
- Grades: Very complex, see "History"

Precedence
- Next (higher): Order of the Gold Lion of the House of Nassau
- Next (lower): Honorable Mention, Bronze Lion
- Equivalent: Order for Loyalty and Merit, Order of the Crown
- Ribbon bar of the Order of the House of Orange

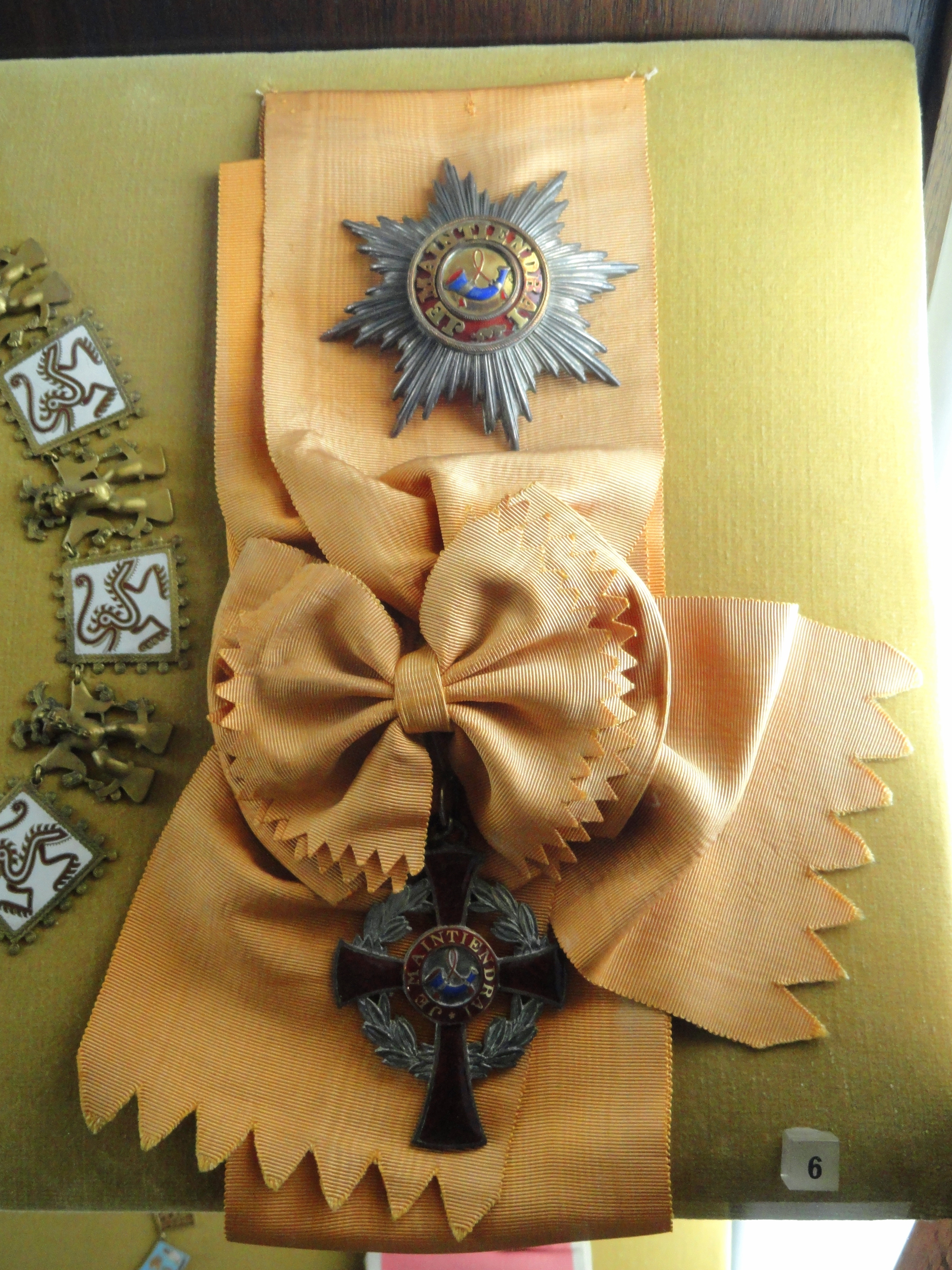
Sash with badge and star of the grade Grand Cross

The Order of the House of Orange (Dutch: Huisorde van Oranje), sometimes referred to as the House Order of Orange, is a dynastic order of the House of Orange-Nassau, the royal family of the Netherlands similar to the Royal Victorian Order in the United Kingdom. The order was instituted by Queen Wilhelmina of the Netherlands on 19 March 1905 and is not subject to ministerial responsibility or influence, but is awarded at the discretion of the Dutch monarch alone.

== History ==
=== 1905–1969 ===
In 1905, Queen Wilhelmina felt the need for a House Order because the Order of the Oak Crown of the Grand Duchy of Luxembourg, used by her father and grandfather to reward Dutch subjects, was no longer available to her, as succession to the throne of Luxembourg was directed by the House treaty of the House of Nassau in a way comparable to the Salic Law within its constitution in 1890.

The Order of the House of Orange had a very complex nomenclature, with 18 different classes and medals:

1. Grand Cross
2. Grand Officer
3. Commander
4. Officer
5. Knight
6. Knight 2nd. Class (since 1908)
7. The Golden Medal for Art and Science (equal in rank to a Grand Officer and very rare)
8. The Golden Medal for Initiative and Ingenuity (since 1917, equal in rank to a Grand Officer and very rare)
9. The Silver Medal for Art and Science (equal in rank to an Officer and rare)
10. The Silver Medal for Initiative and Ingenuity (since 1917, equal in rank to an Officer and rare)
11. Dame of Honour
12. Golden Cross of Merit
13. Silver Cross of Merit
14. Golden Medal of Honour
15. Silver Medal of Honour
16. Bronze Medal of Honour
17. Medal for saving lives from deadly peril (since 1910)
18. The Bronze Medal for Art and Science. (equal in rank to a knight and rare)

The number does not indicate a rank within the Order. The Dame of Honour was neither inferior nor superior to another grade; however the highest rank was the Grand Cross. The insignia vary considerably amongst these awards; however, they all share the same orange ribbon, symbolizing the House of Orange.

More than 3200 decorations were conferred between 1905 and 1969, mostly to Court Dignitaries, the Queen's household, and doctors and lawyers who could choose between sending a bill for their services or a decoration in the House Order.

=== Reorganisation of the order in 1969 ===
By court decree on 30 November 1969, Queen Juliana decided to reorganise the Order to bring it more in line with the ever more egalitarian spirit of the Dutch society. As a result, the order is now divided into four semi-independent groups:

1. The House Order
2. The Order for Loyalty and Merit
3. Honorary medals
  1. The Honorary medal for Arts and Science
  2. The Honorary medal for Initiative and Ingenuity
4. The Order of the Crown

House Order (Honorary Cross)	Order for Loyalty and Merit (Cross in Gold)	Order of the Crown (Honorary Cross)
Ribbon Bar

== The House Order today ==
According to the statutes of the House Order, this Order is awarded to Dutch people (in the Netherlands and abroad) "who have rendered special service to the Dutch King or his House". Nowadays the House Order has four grades:

1. Grand Cross (Grootkruis) - large enameled cross in gold being worn on a sash on the right shoulder + an 8-pointed star on the left chest;
2. Grand Honorary Cross (Groot Erekruis) - large enameled cross in gold worn on a necklet;
3. Honorary Cross (Erekruis) - smaller enameled cross in gold worn on a ribbon on the left chest.
4. Knight's Cross (Ridderkruis) - smaller cross in silver worn on a ribbon on the left chest.

The decorations are the same as those of the previous Grand Crosses, Commanders, Knights 1st Class, and Knights 2nd Class of the House Order of Orange, as it existed until 1969 (although the ribbon bar of the current Honorary Cross looks the same as that of the former 'Officer').

The Honorary Cross is the highest grade in which Dutch people can be directly admitted to the order, with the exception of members of the Royal Family who can be admitted into the order with a higher rank. However, someone can be promoted to a higher rank for ongoing 'special merits' after already being awarded with this order; this also requires a decree from the King. Promotion within the order is gradual, whereby at least three years must have elapsed after the initial admission to the order (art. 6 paragraph 2 of the Statutes). In 2023, a fourth grade of the House Order of Orange was introduced, named the 'Knight's Cross' (comparable to a Knight 2nd class as it existed until 1969). This award is normally intended for persons outside the court staff, but can also be awarded to persons within the Court. This new grade is the next in rank to the 'Honorary Cross'.

Note: The Royal House (Koninklijk Huis) is a rather complex definition within Dutch constitutional theory and Dutch law. It consists of the Monarch, his or her consort, former monarchs and their consorts and those members of his family that have a right to succeed him up to the second degree and their consorts. The Government is responsible for the actions and words of the monarch and in a lesser respect the members of the Royal House. The House is not the same as the Royal Family. The Queen's second son decided not to ask for parliamentary approval for his marriage and lost his right to succeed to the throne, his membership of the Royal House and the title Prince of the Netherlands. He did however retain the style and title of Royal Highness, a Prince of Orange-Nassau and a member of the Royal Family.
