= Bronze Lion =

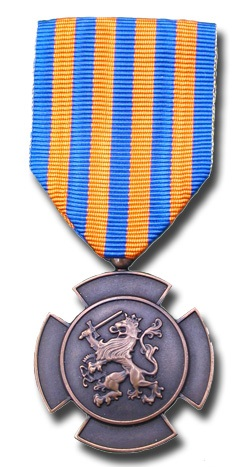
- The Bronze Lion
- Type: Military award
- Awarded for: Deeds of extreme bravery and leadership in battle favouring the Netherlands
- Presented by: Kingdom of the Netherlands
- Status: Currently awarded
- First award: 1944
- Final award: latest 2009 (Björn Peterse, posthumous)

Highlights
- Total: 1212
- Total awarded posthumously: Possible
- Total recipients: 1212
- Ribbon bar of the Bronze Lion

Precedence
- Next (higher): Military Order of William
- Equivalent: Honorable Mention
- Next (lower): Resistance Star East Asia

The Bronze Lion (Dutch: Bronzen Leeuw) is a high Royal Dutch award, intended for servicemen who have shown extreme bravery and leadership in battle favouring The Netherlands; in some special cases it can be awarded to Dutch or foreign civilians. It was first created in 1944 and has since been issued 1,210 times. Proposals for an award are reviewed by the Dutch Board for Bravery Awards, which is part of the Ministry of Defence. If awarded they are enforced by a Royal Decree. The Bronze Lion has precedence after the Order of the House of Orange but is the second-highest military decoration still being awarded for bravery (only preceded by the Military William Order).

== Design ==
The Bronze Lion is a cross in bronze, covered by a round shield. On the front is a relief of the crowned Dutch Lion. The cross is attached to a 37 mm wide ribbon, divided into nine equal vertical stripes, alternately orange and 'Nassau blue', the strips on either edge are Nassau blue. It is possible for a single person to receive more than one award of the Bronze Lion, in which case a number '2' in gold is added on the ribbon of the Bronze Lion.

== Last awarded ==
On Wednesday 31 May 2006, Queen Beatrix of the Netherlands posthumously awarded the late Major General Stanisław Sosabowski, commander of the 1st (Polish) Independent Parachute Brigade, the Bronze Lion for his services in Operation Market Garden in 1944.

On Wednesday 7 October 2009, two Dutch soldiers were awarded the medal: commando Björn Peterse (posthumously awarded) and Captain Gijs Tuinman, for their actions in Afghanistan
