= Wilhelmina of the Netherlands =

Queen of the Netherlands from 1890 to 1948

Wilhelmina
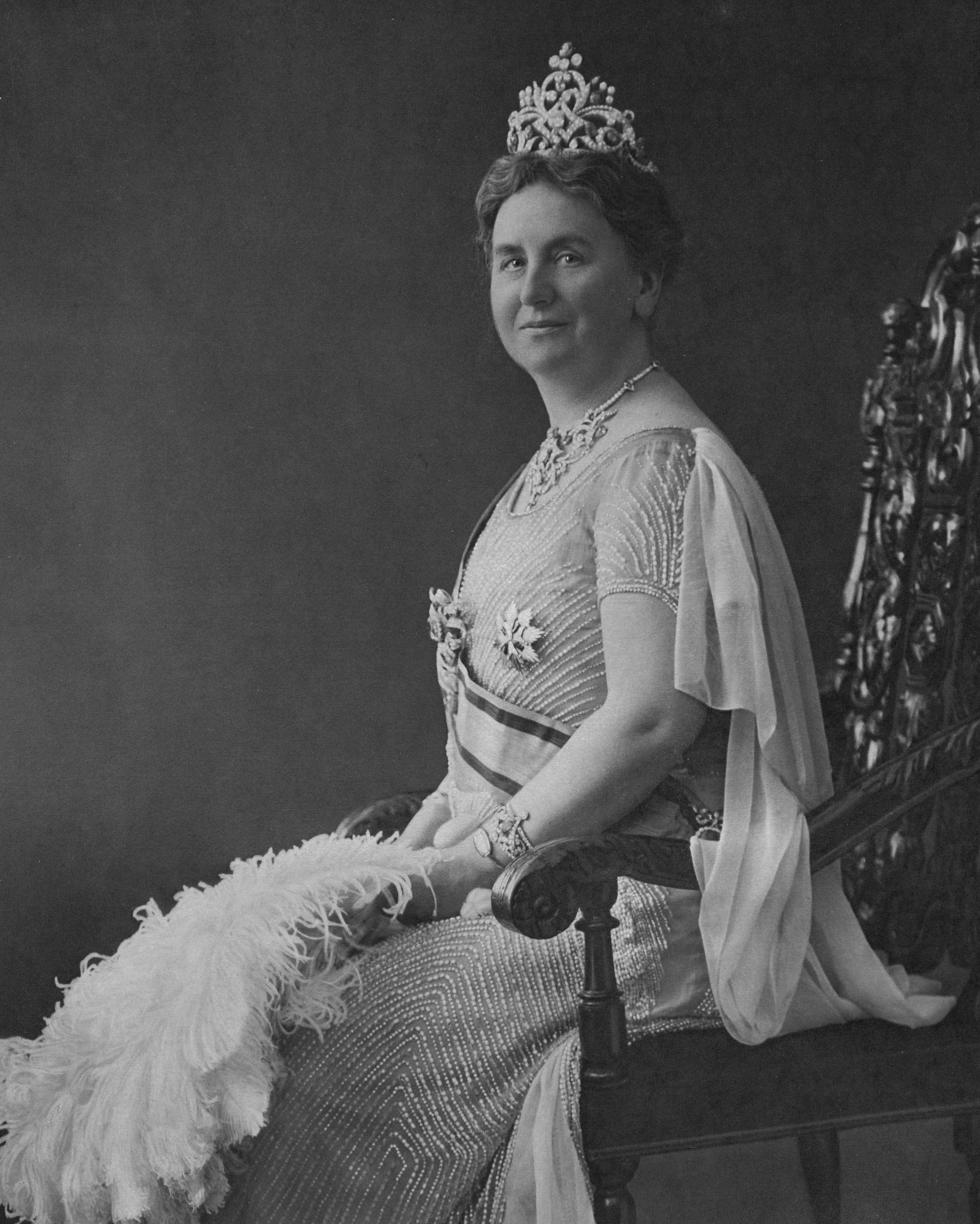
- State Portrait, 1936

Queen of the Netherlands
- Reign: 23 November 1890 – 4 September 1948
- Inauguration: 6 September 1898
- Predecessor: William III
- Successor: Juliana
- Regents: Queen Emma (1890–1898); Princess Juliana (1947–1948)
- Born: Wilhelmina Helena Pauline Maria of Orange-Nassau; 31 August 1880; Noordeinde Palace, The Hague, Netherlands
- Died: 28 November 1962 (aged 82); Het Loo Palace, Apeldoorn, Netherlands
- Burial: 8 December 1962; Nieuwe Kerk, Delft, Netherlands
- Spouse: Duke Henry of Mecklenburg-Schwerin (m. 1901; died 1934)
- Issue: Juliana of the Netherlands
- House: Orange-Nassau
- Father: William III of the Netherlands
- Mother: Emma of Waldeck and Pyrmont
- Religion: Dutch Reformed Church
- Queen Wilhelmina's voice Queen Wilhelmina (third voice heard in recording) while in exile speaks to the Dutch people under Nazi occupation (recorded 16 March 1942)

Wilhelmina (Dutch pronunciation: [ʋɪlɦɛlˈminaː]; Wilhelmina Helena Pauline Maria; 31 August 1880 – 28 November 1962) was Queen of the Netherlands from 1890 until her abdication in 1948. She reigned for nearly 58 years, making her the longest-reigning monarch in Dutch history. Her reign encompassed World War I, the Dutch economic crisis of 1933, and World War II.

The only surviving child of King William III of the Netherlands and Emma of Waldeck and Pyrmont, Wilhelmina ascended the throne at the age of 10 after her father's death in 1890, under her mother's regency. After taking charge of government, Wilhelmina became generally popular for maintaining Dutch neutrality during the First World War and solving many of her country's industrial problems. By that time, her business ventures had made her the world's first female billionaire as measured by U.S. dollars.

Following the German invasion of the Netherlands in 1940, Wilhelmina fled to Britain and took charge of the Dutch government-in-exile. She frequently spoke to the nation over radio and came to be regarded as a symbol of the Dutch resistance. By 1948, she had returned to the liberated Netherlands and was the only survivor of the 17 European monarchs who were reigning at the time of her inauguration. Increasingly beset by poor health, Wilhelmina abdicated in favour of her daughter Juliana in September 1948 and retired to Het Loo Palace, where she died in 1962.

Largely due to her status as a symbol of the Resistance, she remains reasonably popular in the Netherlands, even among the Dutch Republican movement.

== Youth ==
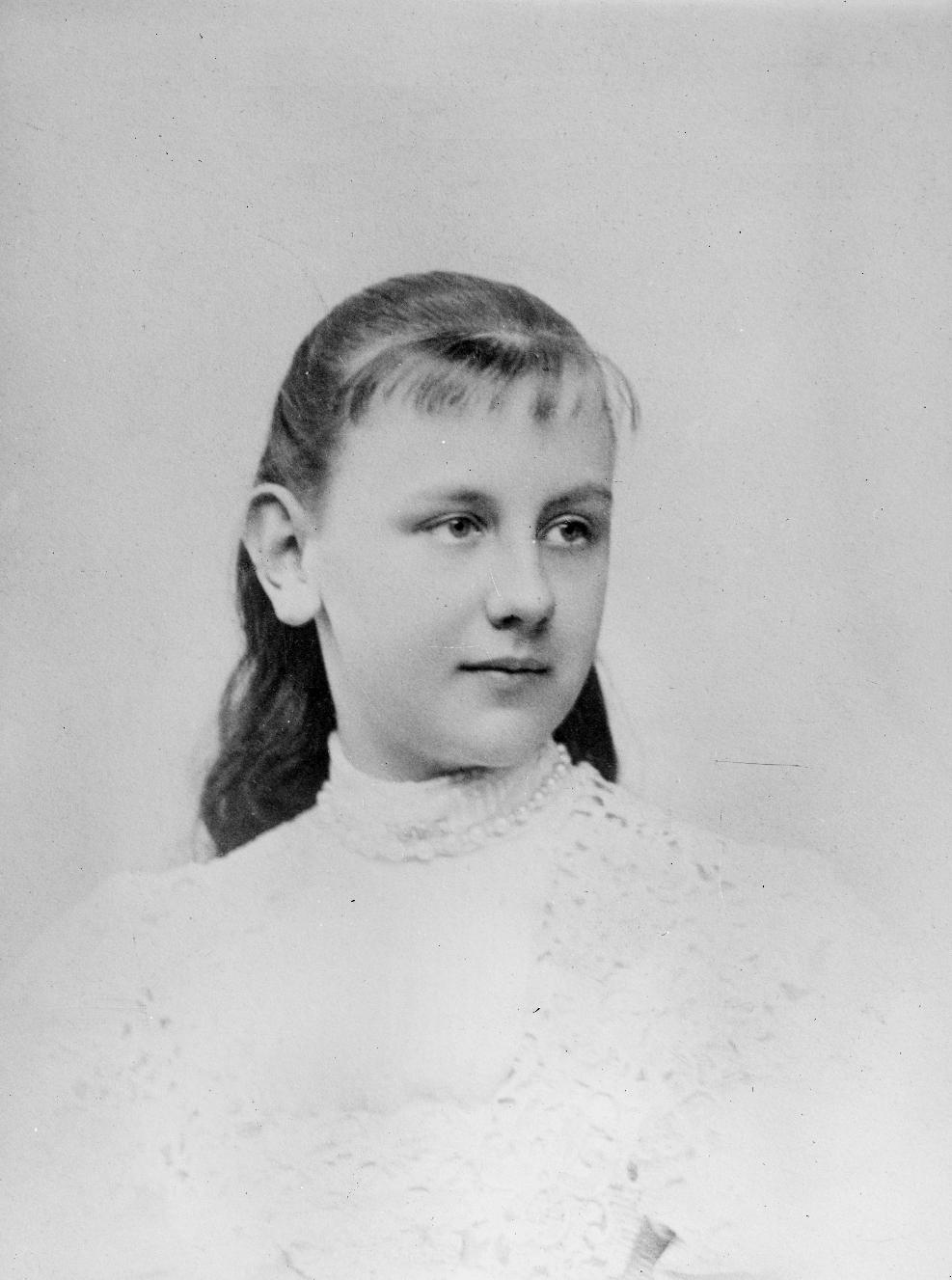
Queen Wilhelmina in the 1890s

Wilhelmina Helena Pauline Maria of Orange-Nassau was born on 31 August 1880, in Noordeinde Palace, The Hague, Netherlands. She was the only child of King William III and Queen Emma. Her childhood was characterised by a close relationship with her parents, especially with her father, who was 63 years old when she was born. In her memoir, Lonely But Not Alone, Wilhelmina wrote that she recalled her father riding horses.

Under the Semi-Salic system of inheritance that was in place in the Netherlands until 1887, Wilhelmina was third in line to the throne from birth. Her father had had three sons with his first wife, Sophie of Württemberg, but two of them had died before Wilhelmina's birth. The only other surviving male relatives from the House of Orange were Wilhelmina's great-uncle Frederick, who died in 1881 when Wilhelmina was one year old, and her half-brother Alexander, who died before she turned four. By 1887, the 70-year-old King finally abandoned the 'hope of a son' with his young wife and made the pragmatic decision to settle the throne upon his only surviving child.

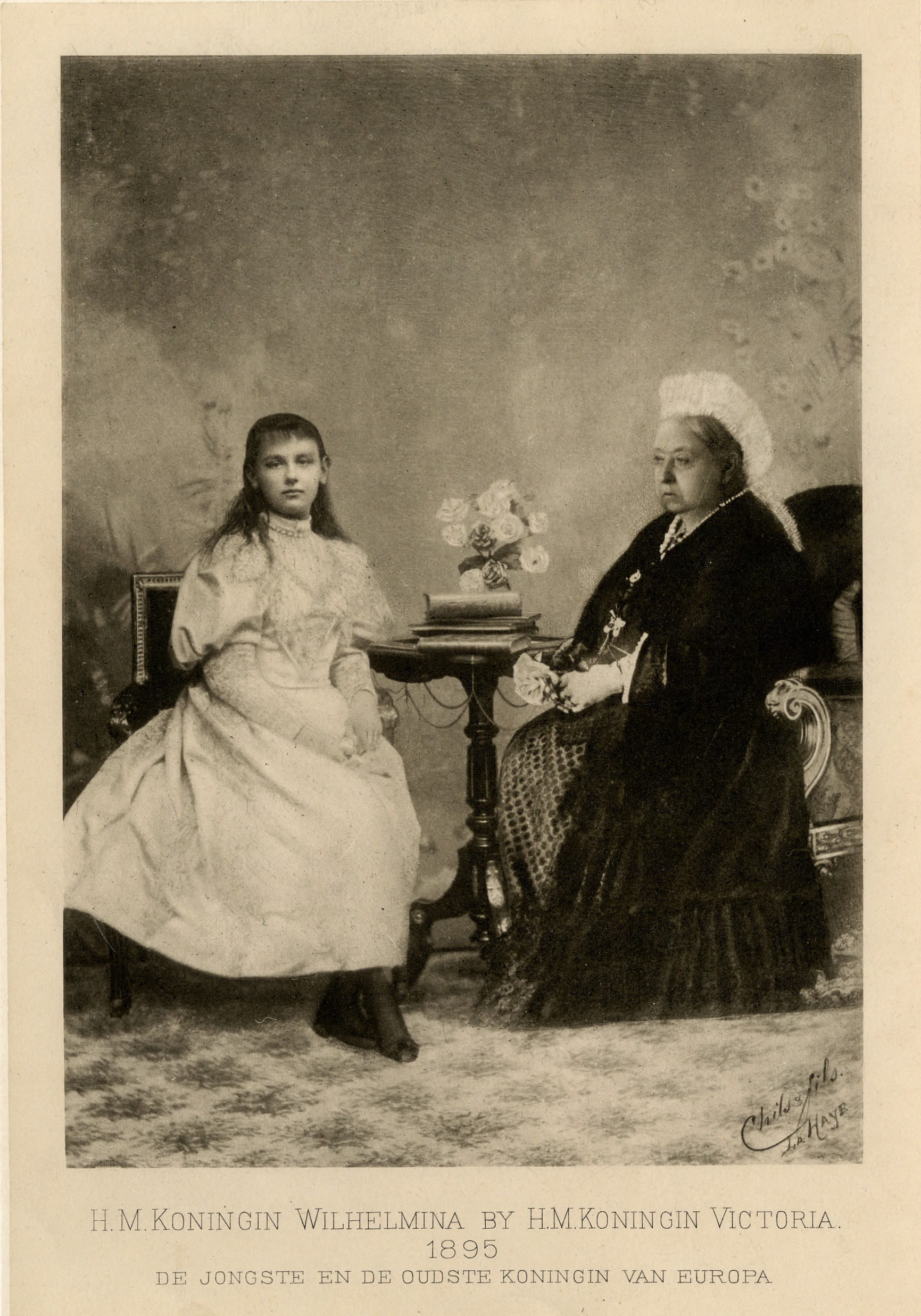
Queen Victoria and Queen Wilhelmina in a montage photo (1895)

King William III died on 23 November 1890 and 10-year-old Wilhelmina became Queen of the Netherlands, though her mother was named regent. In 1895, Wilhelmina visited Queen Victoria of the United Kingdom, who penned an evaluation in her diary: "The young Queen ... still has her hair hanging loose. She is very slight & graceful, has fine features, & seems to be very intelligent & a charming child. She speaks English extremely well & has very pretty manners."

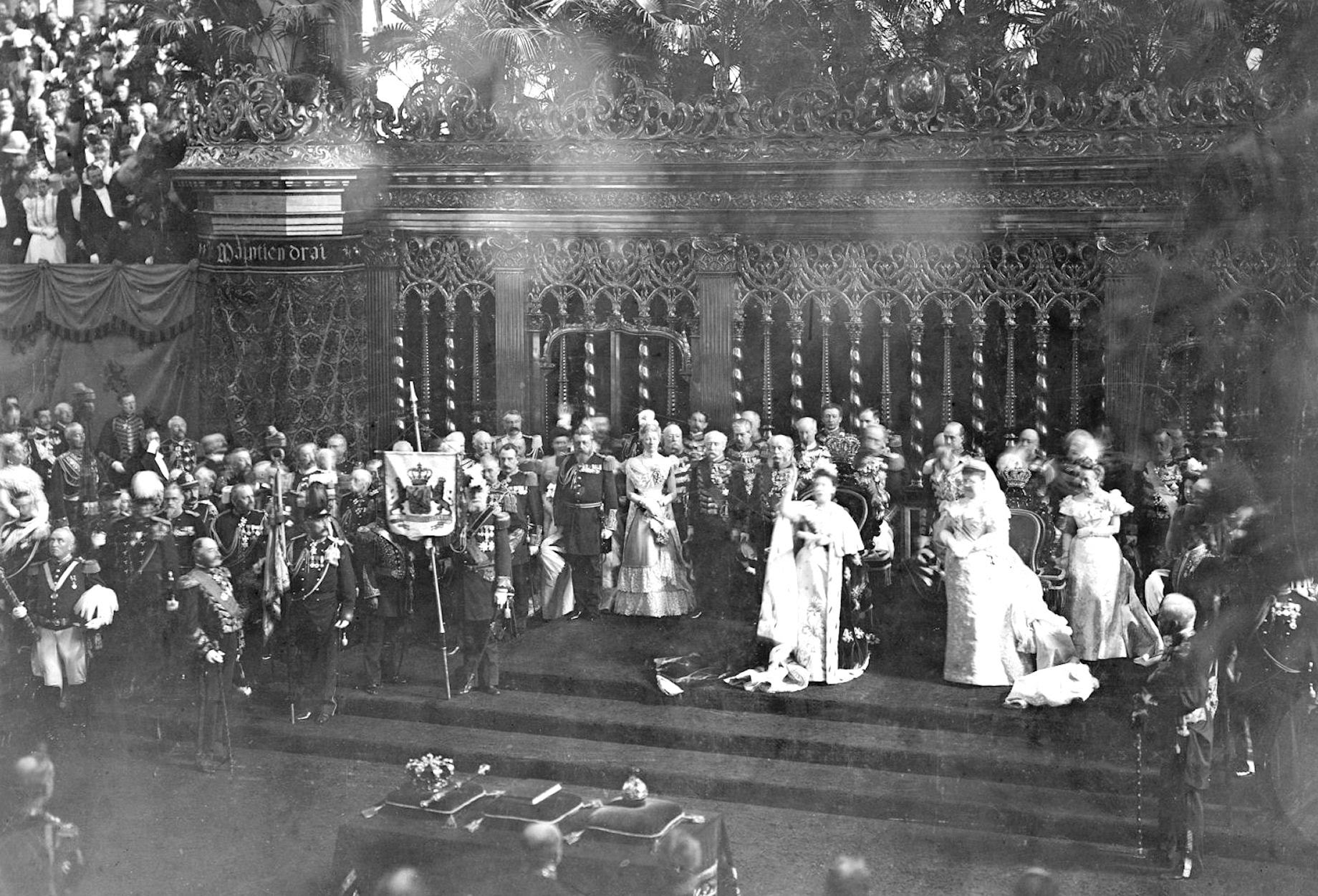
Wilhelmina's inauguration

Wilhelmina turned 18 on 31 August 1898, and was thus entitled to exercise the royal prerogative in her own right. Six days later, on 6 September, she was sworn-in at the Nieuwe Kerk in Amsterdam. She was well aware what was expected by the elected representatives, but was a strong-willed, forceful woman who spoke and acted her mind. She "hated" politicians and instead stated a love for the people. Reflecting popular opinion in the Netherlands at the time, Wilhelmina expressed a level of disdain towards the British for their annexations of the Transvaal Republic and the Orange Free State in the Boer War. The Boers were descended from Dutch colonists who migrated to the region while it was a Dutch colony, and the Dutch people, Wilhelmina included, felt a close level of affinity towards them. In one conversation with her former governess, the Briton Elisabeth Saxton Winter, Wilhelmina referred to the Boer commandos as "excellent shots". During the war, Wilhelmina ordered the Dutch cruiser HNLMS Gelderland to Portuguese East Africa to evacuate Paul Kruger, the president of the South African Republic.

== Marriage ==
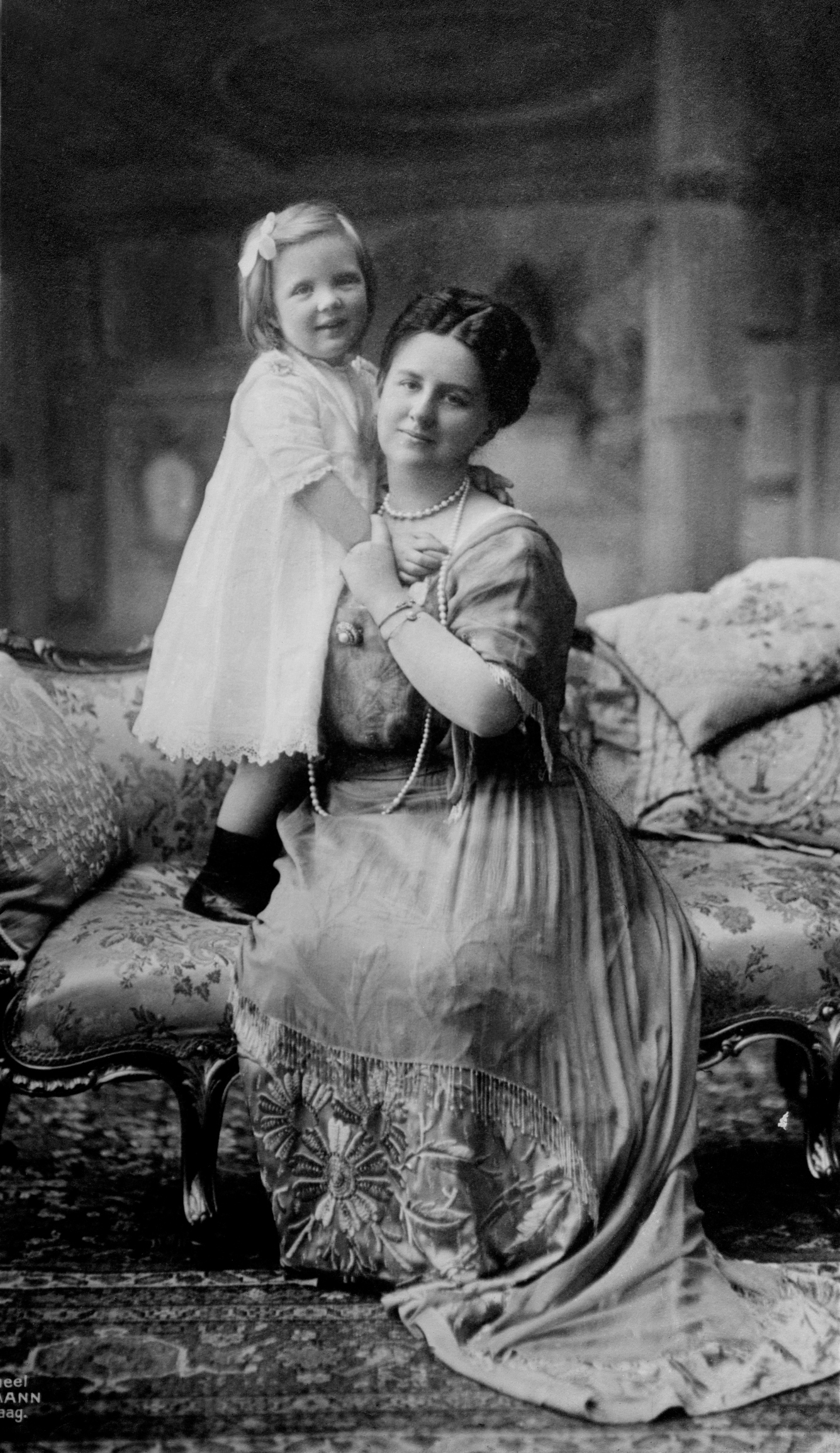
Queen Wilhelmina and her daughter Juliana, circa 1914

On 7 February 1901 in The Hague, Queen Wilhelmina married Duke Henry of Mecklenburg-Schwerin. Although she was devoted to her spouse at the time of their wedding, it proved in the long run to be an unhappy marriage that did little more than meet its obligation by producing an heir. Prince Henry was known to have had numerous extra-marital affairs, at least one of which resulted in illegitimate offspring. On 9 November, nine months after her marriage, Wilhelmina suffered a miscarriage. On 4 May 1902, she gave birth to a premature stillborn son. This may have been an abortion, needed to save her life after a typhoid infection. Her next pregnancy ended in another miscarriage on 23 July 1906. During this time Wilhelmina's heir presumptive was her first cousin once removed William Ernest, Grand Duke of Saxe-Weimar-Eisenach. Next in line was her cousin Marie Alexandrine of Saxe-Weimar-Eisenach.

As it was assumed that the former would renounce his claim to the Dutch throne and that the latter was too elderly at 57 to become queen, Marie Alexandrine's eldest son, German Prince Heinrich XXXII Reuss of Köstritz, stood in line to succeed Wilhelmina if she had no surviving children. Prince Heinrich had close associations with the German Imperial family and military, so there were fears that were the Queen to remain childless, the Dutch Crown "was bound to pass into the possession of a German prince, whose birth, training, and affiliations would naturally have led him to bring Holland [sic] within the sphere of the German Empire, at the expense of its independence, both national and economic", according to one contemporary publication. The birth of Princess Juliana, on 30 April 1909, was met with great relief after eight years of her childless marriage. Wilhelmina, who formed a close relationship with her daughter, suffered two further miscarriages on 23 January and 20 October 1912. Wilhelmina and Juliana would be the last Dutch royal babies to survive childbirth until Juliana's daughter Beatrix was born in 1938.

== World War I ==
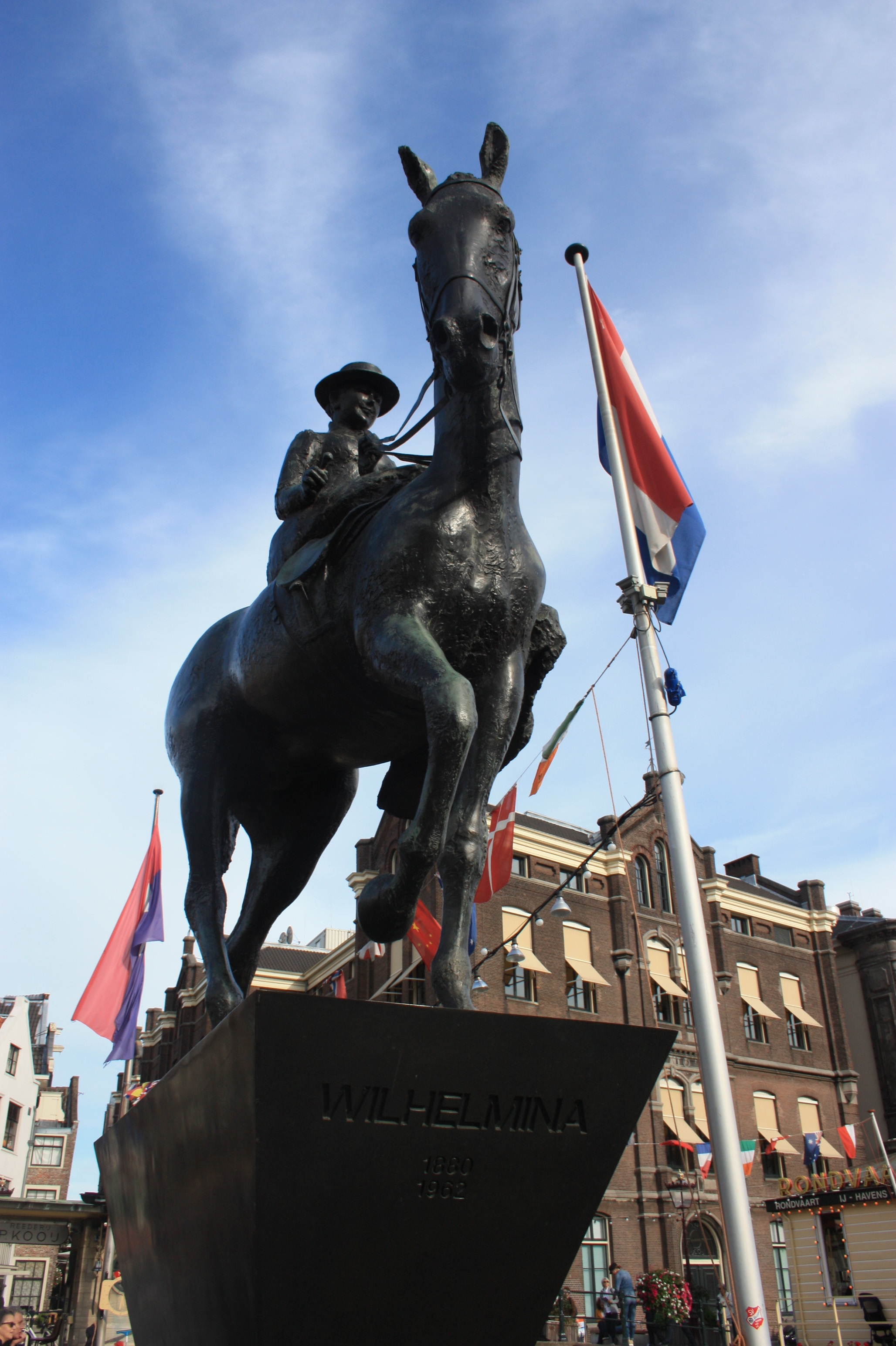
Statue of Queen Wilhelmina of the Netherlands, Amsterdam

Before the First World War began, Wilhelmina visited the powerful German Emperor Wilhelm II. The emperor thought he could impress the ruler of a relatively small country by telling her, "My guards are seven feet tall and yours are only shoulder-high to them." The queen smiled politely and replied, "Quite true, Your Majesty, your guards are seven feet tall. But when we open our dikes, the water is ten feet deep!" She was very wary of a German attack, especially in the beginning. Partly due to her political influence, the Netherlands remained neutral during World War I. However, the Allies included the Netherlands in their blockade of Germany, intercepting all Dutch ships and severely restricting Dutch imports to ensure that goods could not be passed on to Germany. Furthermore, the Russian Revolution by the Bolsheviks in 1917 cost the queen almost 20% of her financial assets.

Being a woman, Wilhelmina could not be the supreme commander, but still used every opportunity she had to inspect the Crown forces. She appeared without prior notice on many occasions to see reality instead of a prepared show. She wanted a small but well-trained and equipped army and was very unhappy with most of her governments, which were always eager to cut the military budget. On 6 September 1916 Wilhelmina was aboard the Dutch submarine O 3 while it performed underwater exercises. This made Wilhemina the second head of state, after the American president Theodore Roosevelt who was the first, to sail and dive aboard a submarine. She was also the first woman to go underwater aboard a submarine. In June 1917, Wilhelmina returned from a two-day visit to Zaltbommel on the train that derailed at Houten, but remained unharmed and helped to take care of the injured.

Civil unrest gripped the Netherlands after the war, spurred by the end of the Russian Empire. Instead of a violent revolution, Socialist leader Pieter Jelles Troelstra wanted to abolish the existing government and the monarchy by winning control of Parliament in an election with the support of the working class. However, Wilhelmina's popularity helped restore confidence in the government. She brought about a mass show of support by riding alongside her daughter through the crowds in an open carriage.

At the end of World War I, Kaiser Wilhelm fled to the Netherlands, where he was granted political asylum, partly owing to his familial links with the royal family. In response to Allied efforts to get their hands on the deposed Kaiser, Wilhelmina called the Allies' ambassadors to her presence and lectured them on the rights of asylum.

== Interwar period ==
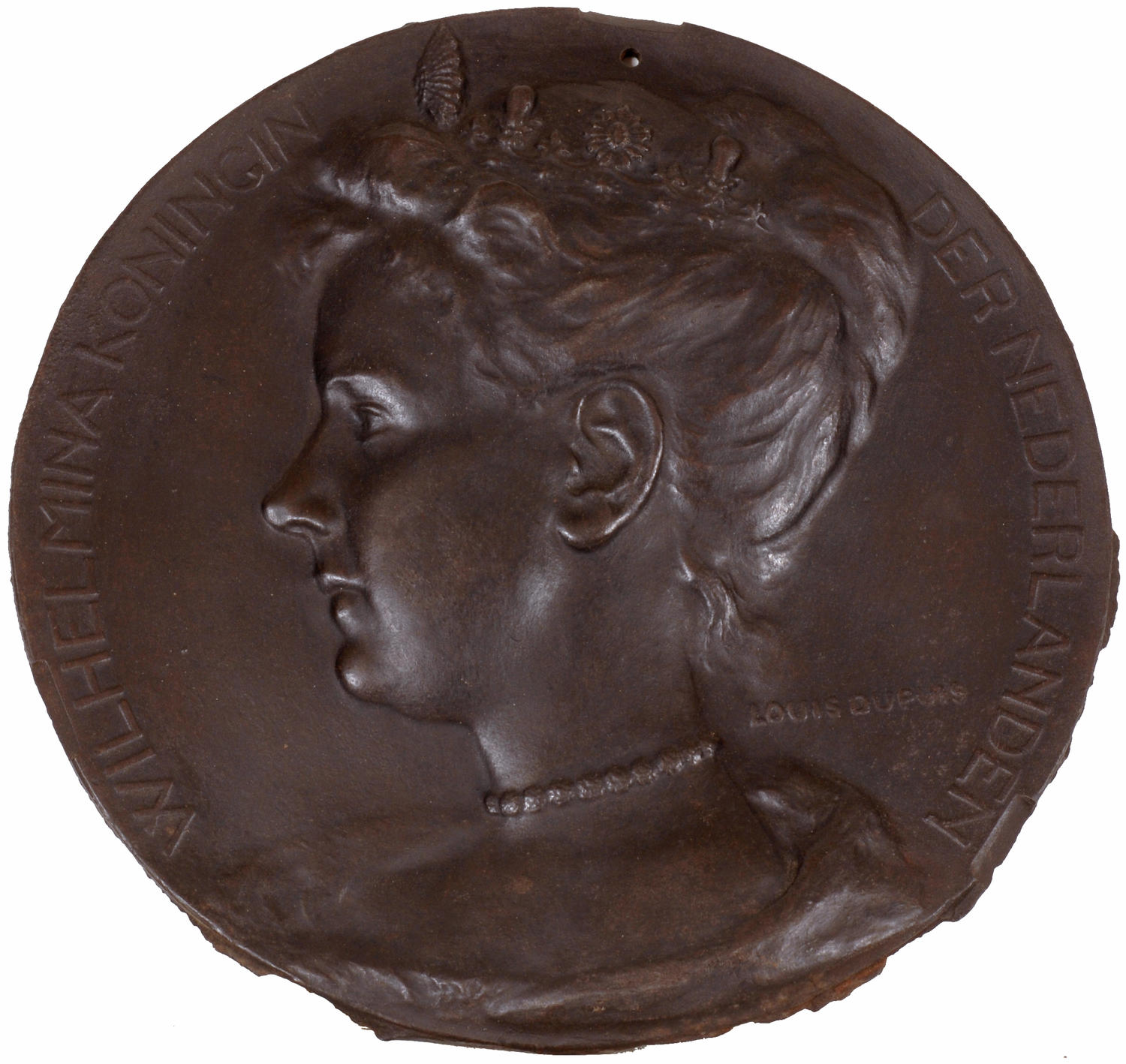
Medal depicting Queen Wilhelmina

Wilhelmina used her personal wealth inherited from her family to make several investments in the United States, which eventually made her the world's richest woman and first female billionaire in dollars. During the 1920s and 1930s, the Netherlands began to emerge as an industrial power with the help of the Queen's funds. Engineers reclaimed vast amounts of land that had been under water by building the Zuiderzee Works, the largest hydraulic engineering project undertaken by the Netherlands during the 20th century. Its main purposes were to improve flood protection and create additional land for agriculture.

In 1939, the government proposed a refugee camp near the city of Apeldoorn for German Jews fleeing the Nazi regime. However, Wilhelmina intervened because she felt the planned location was "too close" to the royal family's summer residence. Indeed if spies were to be among the fugitives, they would be within walking distance of Het Loo Palace. After long discussions, the camp was finally erected about 10 km from the village of Westerbork.

Aside from economical and security matters, Queen Wilhelmina used most of the 1930s to find a suitable husband for Juliana. This was a difficult task since she was very religious and insisted that her daughter's husband would be a Protestant of royal birth. Many prospects from the United Kingdom and Sweden either declined or were turned down by Juliana. Finally, mother and daughter found a suitable match in German Prince Bernhard of Lippe-Biesterfeld. Wilhelmina had her lawyers draft a very detailed prenuptial agreement that specified exactly what her future son-in-law could and could not do.

== World War II ==
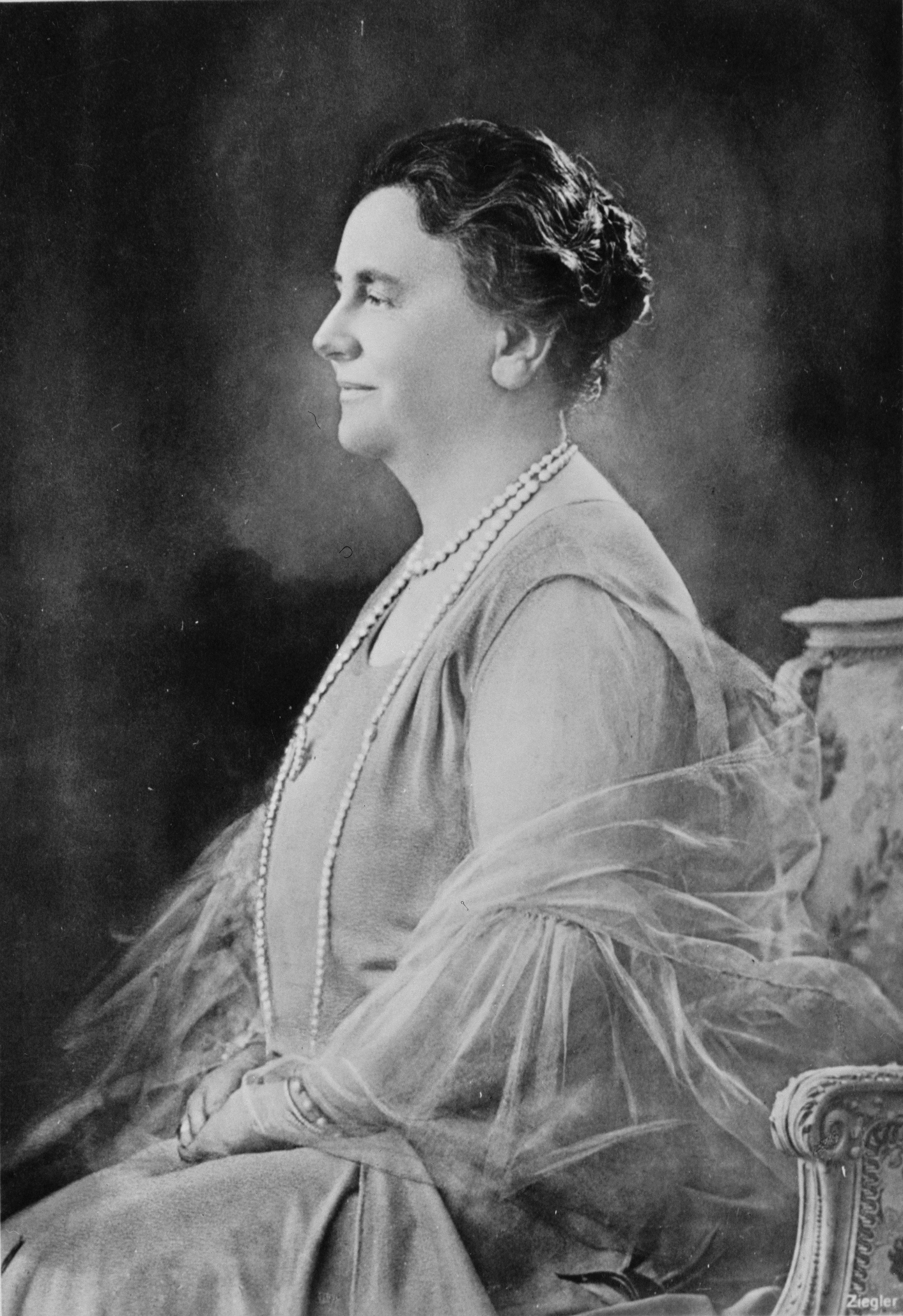
Queen Wilhelmina in 1942

On 10 May 1940, Germany invaded the Netherlands. Despite her hostility towards the British, the almost sixty-year-old Queen Wilhelmina and her family fled The Hague and boarded HMS Hereward, a British destroyer sent by King George VI to take them across the North Sea. There is an ongoing debate about the royal family's departure. Some say that an evacuation to the United Kingdom had been planned some time in advance, since at least the end of 1939. Others say the queen boarded the destroyer with the intent of going to the Dutch province of Zeeland, which had not yet been conquered. However, along the journey, it became clear that due to advancing German forces, Zeeland was not safe either, forcing the destroyer to sail for the United Kingdom. In any case, she arrived in the United Kingdom on 13 May, planning to return to the Netherlands as soon as possible. The Dutch armed forces in the Netherlands, apart from those in Zeeland, surrendered on 15 May.

In Britain, Queen Wilhelmina took charge of the Dutch government in exile, setting up a chain of command and immediately communicating a message to her people. Relations between the new Dutch government and the queen were tense, with mutual dislike growing as the war progressed. She went on to be the most prominent figure, owing to her experience and knowledge, which earned her respect and support among the other leaders of the world. On the other hand, the new Dutch government did not have a parliament to back them and had few employees to assist them. The Dutch prime minister, Dirk Jan de Geer, believed the Allies would not win and intended to open negotiations with Germany for a separate peace. Therefore, Wilhelmina sought to remove De Geer from power. With the aid of minister Pieter Gerbrandy, she succeeded.

During the war, Queen Wilhelmina's photograph was a sign of resistance against the Germans. Like Winston Churchill, Wilhelmina broadcast messages to the Dutch people over Radio Oranje. She called Adolf Hitler "the arch-enemy of mankind". Her late-night broadcasts were eagerly awaited by her people, who had to hide to listen to them illegally. An anecdote published in her New York Times obituary illustrates how she was valued by her subjects during this period:

Although celebration of the Queen's birthday was forbidden by the Germans, it was commemorated nevertheless. When churchgoers in the small fishing town of Huizen rose and sang one verse of the Dutch national anthem, Wilhelmus van Nassauwe, on the Queen's birthday, the town paid a fine of 60,000 guilders.

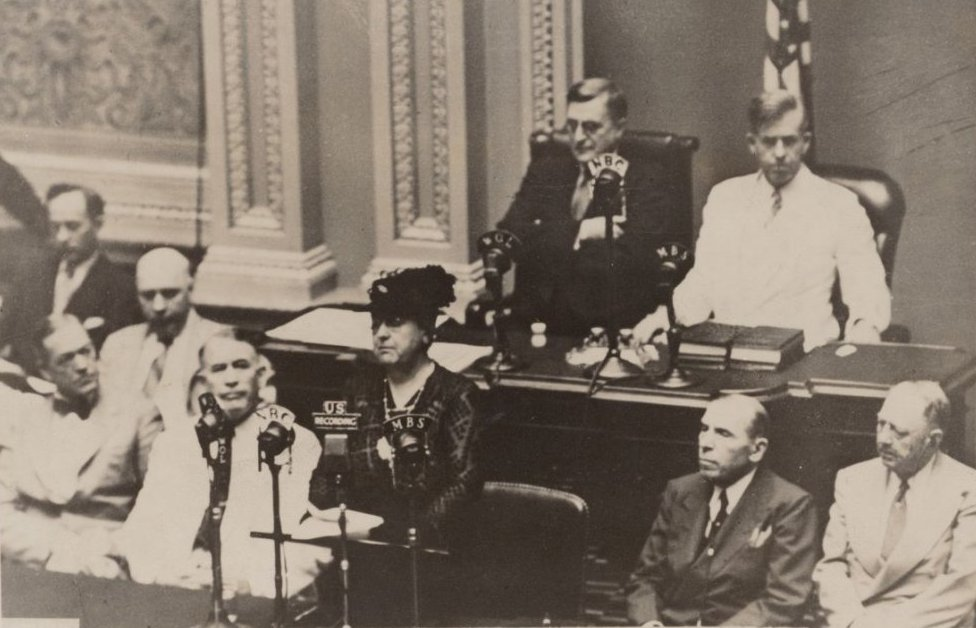
Queen Wilhelmina speaking to the US Congress, 1942

Queen Wilhelmina visited the United States from 24 June to 11 August 1942 as a guest of the U.S. government. She vacationed in Lee, Massachusetts, and visited New York City, Boston, and Albany, New York. In Albany, she attended the 300th anniversary celebration of the First Church in Albany, established by Dutch settlers in the 17th century. She addressed the U.S. Congress on 5 August 1942 and was the first queen to do so. Shortly afterwards, Wilhelmina went to Canada in 1943 to attend the christening of her new granddaughter Margriet on 29 June 1943 in Ottawa and stayed a while with her family before returning to the United Kingdom.

During the German bombing campaign Operation Steinbock, Queen Wilhelmina was almost killed by a bomb that took the lives of several of her guards and severely damaged her residence near South Mimms in England. In 1944, Wilhelmina became the first woman since the 15th century, other than queens of the United Kingdom, to be inducted into the Order of the Garter. Churchill described her as "the only real man among the governments-in-exile" in London.

In England, Queen Wilhelmina developed ideas about a new political and social life for the Dutch after the liberation, wanting to create a strong cabinet formed by people active in the resistance. She dismissed De Geer and installed a new prime minister with the approval of other Dutch politicians. When the Netherlands was liberated in 1945, the queen was disappointed to see the same political factions taking power as before the war. In mid-March 1945, she travelled to the liberated areas of the southern Netherlands, visiting the region of Walcheren and the city of Eindhoven where she received a rapturous welcome from the local population. On 2 May 1945, she went to stay in a small country estate called Anneville located just south of Breda with Juliana and adjuncts Peter Tazelaar, Erik Hazelhoff Roelfzema and fellow Engelandvaarder Rie Stokvis. Anneville was the scene of a number of processions where the residents of Breda and the surrounding communities came to greet their Queen. She remained there for a little over six weeks.

Shortly after the war, Queen Wilhelmina wanted to give an award to the Polish Parachute Brigade for their actions during Operation Market Garden and wrote the government a request. The Minister of Foreign Affairs, Eelco van Kleffens, opposed the idea because he thought an award for the Poles would upset relations with the 'Big Three' and harm national interests. Eventually the Polish Parachute Brigade were awarded the Military Order of William on 31 May 2006, 61 years after Operation Market Garden.

== Later years ==
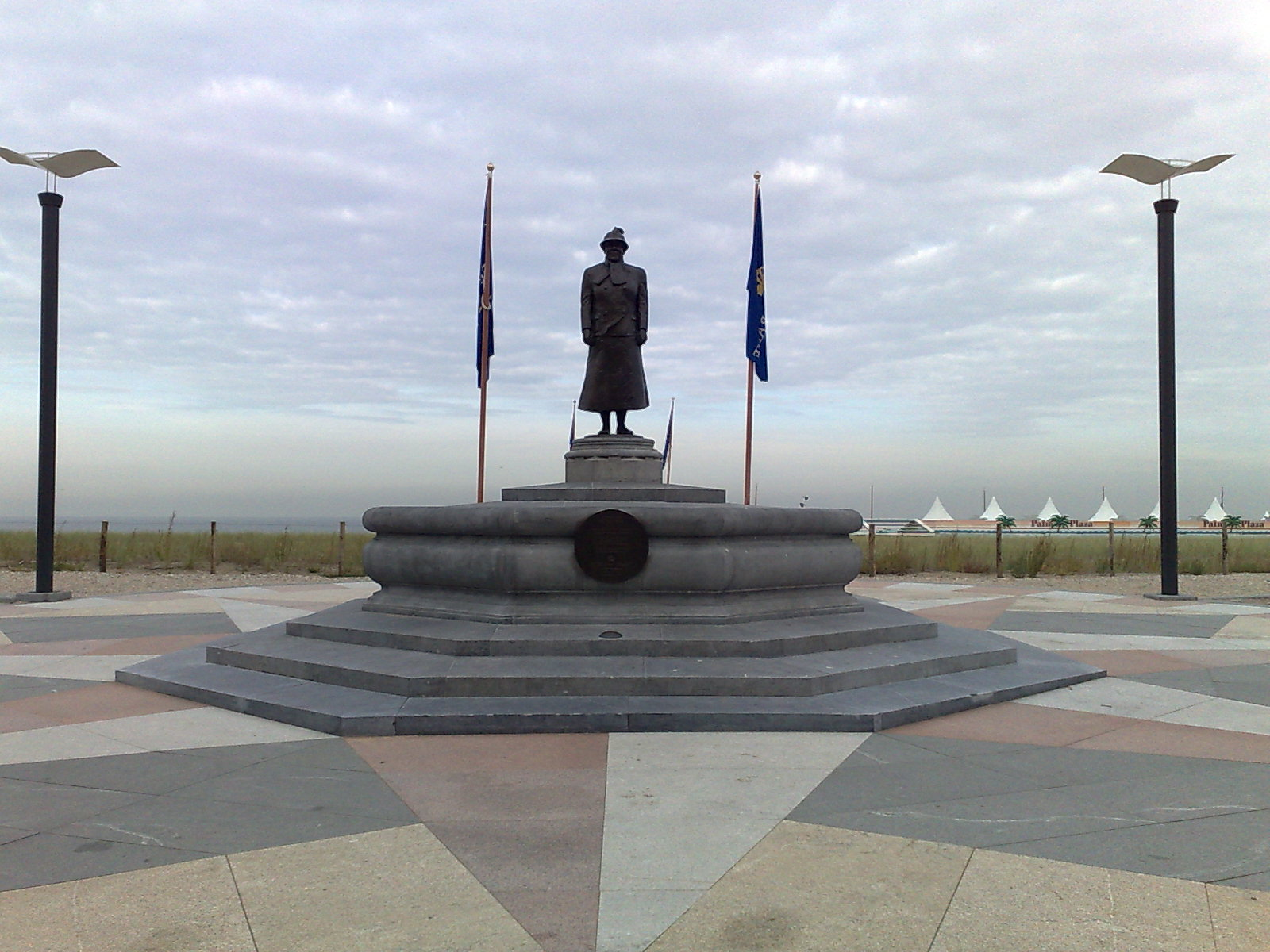
Statue of Queen Wilhelmina in Noordwijk

Collecting signatures for the queen, 1948

Following the end of World War II, Queen Wilhelmina made the decision not to return to her palace but to move into a mansion in The Hague, where she lived for eight months. She travelled through the countryside to motivate people, sometimes using a bicycle instead of a car. However, in 1947, while the country was still recovering, the nationalist rebellion in the oil-rich Dutch East Indies saw the sharp criticism of the queen by the Dutch economic elite.

Around the same time, Queen Wilhelmina's health started failing, forcing her to cede her monarchial duties to Princess Juliana temporarily towards the end of 1947 (14 October – 1 December). She considered abdication, but her daughter pressed her to stay on for the stability of the nation. Wilhelmina had every intention of doing so, but exhaustion forced her to relinquish monarchial duties to Juliana again on 12 May 1948, which left the princess to deal with the early elections caused by the ceding of the Indonesian colonies.

Dismayed by the return to pre-war politics and the pending loss of Indonesia, Wilhelmina abdicated on 4 September 1948 after a reign of 57 years and 286 days due to advancing age and illness. She passed the crown to Juliana and was hence forward styled "Her Royal Highness Princess Wilhelmina of the Netherlands". Since then, the influence of the Dutch monarchy continued to decline but the country's love for its royal family continued.

No longer queen, Wilhelmina retreated to Het Loo Palace, making few public appearances until the country was devastated by the North Sea flood of 1953. Once again, she travelled around the country to encourage and motivate the Dutch people. During her last years, she wrote her autobiography, entitled Eenzaam, maar niet alleen (Lonely but Not Alone), in which she gave her account of the events in her life and revealed her strong religious feelings.

Wilhelmina died of cardiac arrest in Het Loo Palace at the age of 82 on 28 November 1962. She was buried in the Dutch royal family crypt in the Nieuwe Kerk in Delft, on 8 December. At her request and contrary to protocol, the funeral was completely in white to give expression to her belief that earthly death was the beginning of eternal life.

In addition to being the last male-line descendant of the House of Orange-Nassau, she was also the last great-grandchild of Emperor Paul I of Russia.

== In popular culture ==
- She was portrayed by Andrea Domburg in Paul Verhoeven's 1977 film Soldier of Orange.
- Queen Wilhelmina appears as leader of the Netherlands the Rise and Fall expansion of Civilization VI.

== Titles, styles and honours ==
=== Titles and styles ===
Monogram of Queen Wilhelmina

- 31 August 1880 – 21 June 1884: Her Royal Highness Princess Pauline of Orange-Nassau
- 21 June 1884 – 23 November 1890: Her Royal Highness Princess Wilhelmina of Orange-Nassau
- 23 November 1890 – 4 September 1948: Her Majesty Queen Wilhelmina, Queen of the Netherlands, Princess of Orange-Nassau
- 4 September 1948 – 28 November 1962: Her Royal Highness Princess Wilhelmina of the Netherlands

Wilhelmina's full regnal title from her accession to her marriage was: "Wilhelmina, by the Grace of God, Queen of the Netherlands, Princess of Orange-Nassau, Duchess of Limburg, etc." She adopted her husband's ducal title upon marriage as customary, becoming also a duchess of Mecklenburg.

=== Honours ===
- Netherlands:
  - Grand Master of the Military William Order, 1890; Grand Cross, 4 September 1948
  - Grand Master of the Order of the Netherlands Lion, 1890
  - Grand Master of the Order of Orange-Nassau, 1890
  - Joint Grand Master of the Order of the Gold Lion of Nassau, 1890
  - Grand Master of the Order of the House of Orange, 1890
  - Founder of the Johanniter Order, 1909

Since Wilhelmina received no Dutch honours before ascending the throne aged ten and resigned the position of grand master when she abdicated in 1948, she was in the unusual position of being a Dutch princess and former queen who did not hold a Dutch honour. Her daughter and successor therefore appointed her Grand Cross of the Military William Order in her first act as Queen. This was the only Dutch honour she ever held in her life in a personal capacity.

Asteroid 392 Wilhelmina is named after Queen Wilhelmina.

==== Foreign ====
Garter-encircled Royal Arms of Queen Wilhelmina displayed on her Order of the Garter placard on display in St. George's Hall, Windsor Castle

- Austro-Hungarian Imperial and Royal Family: Grand Cross of the Order of Elizabeth, 1901
- Belgium:
  - Grand Cordon of the Order of Leopold (civil), August 1898
  - Croix de Guerre Medal
- Brazil: Grand Cross of the Southern Cross
- Czechoslovakia: Collar of the White Lion, 1929
- Denmark: Knight of the Elephant, 5 September 1922
- Ethiopian Imperial Family: Collar of the Order of Solomon
- Finland: Collar of the White Rose, with Star, 1932
- France: Grand Cross of the Legion of Honour, April 1898
- German Imperial and Royal Family: Dame of the Order of Louise, 1st Division, 30 May 1901
  - Mecklenburg Grand Ducal Family: Grand Cross of the Wendish Crown, with Bronze Crown, 7 February 1901
  - Oldenburg Grand Ducal Family: Grand Cross of the Order of Duke Peter Friedrich Ludwig
- Greek Royal Family: Grand Cross of the Redeemer
- Guatemala: Grand Cross of the Quetzal
- Japan: Grand Cordon of the Precious Crown, 8 August 1899
- Luxembourg:
  - Knight of the Gold Lion of Nassau
  - Grand Cross of the Oak Crown
- Military Order of Malta: Dame of Honour and Devotion
- Norway: Grand Cross of St. Olav, with Collar, 15 September 1922
- Persian Imperial Family: Order of the Sun, 1st Class
- Peru: Grand Cross of the Sun of Peru, in Diamonds, 1922
- Poland: Knight of the White Eagle
- Portuguese Royal Family:
  - Dame of the Order of Queen Saint Isabel
  - Grand Cross of the Sash of the Three Orders, 7 February 1901
- Romanian Royal Family:
  - Grand Cross of the Star of Romania
  - Grand Collar of the Order of Carol I
- Russian Imperial Family: Grand Cross of St. Catherine
- Siam: Dame of the Order of the Royal House of Chakri, 7 September 1897
- Spanish Royal Family:
  - Dame of the Order of Queen Maria Luisa, 22 December 1890
  - Dame of the Collar of the Order of Charles III
  - Dame of the Collar of the Order of Isabella the Catholic
- Sweden: Member of the Order of the Seraphim, 9 September 1922
- Turkish Imperial Family: Grand Cross of the Order of Charity
- United Kingdom:
  - Royal Order of Victoria and Albert, 1st Class, 1898
  - Associate Dame Grand Cross of St. John, 19 June 1941
  - Stranger Lady Companion of the Garter, 24 September 1944
- Yugoslavian Royal Family: Grand Cross of the White Eagle

=== Eponyms ===
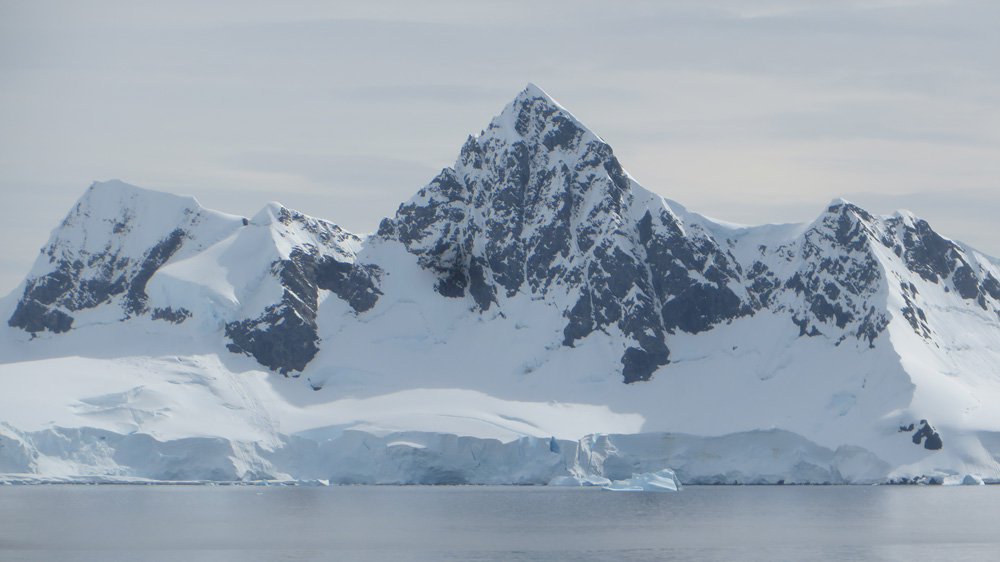
Wilhelmina Bay on the Antarctic Peninsula

- Queen Wilhelmina State Park in Arkansas, and Wilhelmina Bay in Antarctica are named for Queen Wilhelmina.
- In 1892, the company Fortuin celebrated its 50th anniversary by producing peppermint candy with the image of the 12-year-old Princess Wilhelmina, which have continued in production since then. Among Dutch sweets, these mints have become the "most Dutch of all".

== Lèse-majesté case ==
After Wilhelmina had taken office in 1890, rumours were spread by Socialist satirical magazine De Roode Duivel ("The Red Devil") that William III was not her real father, but Emma's confidant, Sebastiaan Mattheus Sigismund de Ranitz. This would undermine the legitimacy of the Queen's reign. Although no hard evidence exists for the allegations and the consensus amongst historians is that they are false, the rumours were stubborn and still feature in conspiracy theories circulating in republican circles. (Note: The royal detective Koningskind (2011) by Rob van Hoorn and the thriller IV (2013) by Arjen Lubach both revolve around a fictional investigative journalist who tries finding out whether someone other than William III (perhaps De Ranitz) was the actual father of Wilhelmina, which might result in a constitutional crisis.) The author of the rumour, the later parliamentarian and senator Louis Maximiliaan Hermans, was sentenced to six months imprisonment for lèse-majesté in 1895 for a different article and cartoon in De Roode Duivel, mocking the two queens.

== Sources ==
- Hubbard, Robert H. (1977). Rideau Hall: An Illustrated History of Government House, Ottawa, from Victorian Times to the Present Day. Montreal: McGill-Queen's University Press. ISBN 978-0-7735-0310-6
- Wilhelmina. (1959). Eenzaam maar niet alleen. Amsterdam: Ten Have Uitgevers Kok. ISBN 978-90-259-5146-7. Full text (pdf, 8 MB) online.

Wilhelmina of the Netherlands House of Orange-Nassau Cadet branch of the House of Nassau Born: 31 August 1880 Died: 28 November 1962
Regnal titles
Preceded by William III	Queen of the Netherlands; 1890–1948	Succeeded by Juliana
