= Orders, decorations, and medals of the Netherlands =

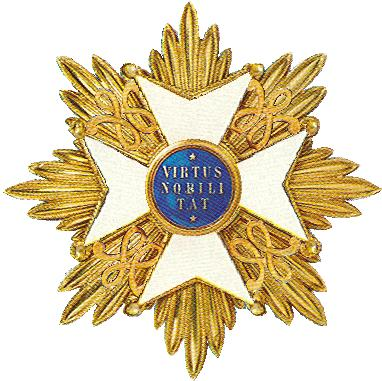
Grand cross of the Order of the Netherlands Lion.

In the Dutch honours system, most orders are the responsibility of ministers of the Netherlands Government. The house orders, however, are awarded at the discretion of the Dutch monarch alone.

Over the centuries, hundreds of medals, decorations for merit or valour and orders of knighthood have been instituted by the successive governments of the Netherlands. The oldest were founded by the counts of Holland. Their successors, the House of Burgundy, founded the famous Order of the Golden Fleece. This order still exists in Spain and in the Austrian imperial House.

The Republic of the Seven United Netherlands did not possess an order of knighthood. Instead so called "Beloningspenningen", golden medals on golden chains, were given as gifts to ambassadors and successful admirals.

In 1781 a medal called the "Doggersbank medaille" was awarded to the officers who took part in the Battle of the Dogger Bank against the British fleet. It was the first modern Dutch decoration.

The Batavian Republic, founded after the French invasion of 1795, did not institute any orders or medals.

The Kingdom of Holland was founded in 1805 to provide a throne for Napoleon's younger brother Lodewijk Napoleon Bonaparte. The "King of Holland" founded an "Orde van de Unie", (English: Order of the Union, later dubbed "Order of Holland" then "Royal Order of Holland").

The first king of the Netherlands, William I, founded the Military Order of William and a civilian order, the Order of the Netherlands Lion.

His successors founded several orders of merit and some two hundred medals, stars and crosses. The Netherlands never established a colonial order for the Dutch East Indies.

The order of wear of Dutch Honours is published in the Staatscourant. The orders, decorations and medals are listed in that order below.

== Orders of chivalry and similar distinctions ==
- Military William Order, founded on 30 April 1815 by King William I
- Cross for Courage and Fidelity (Kruis voor Moed en Trouw)
- Honorary Sabre (Eresabel)
- Dutch Cross of Resistance (Verzetskruis 1940–1945)
- Honorary Medal for Charitable Assistance (Erepenning voor Menslievend Hulpbetoon)
- Order of the Netherlands Lion, founded on 29 September 1815 by King William I
- Order of Orange-Nassau, founded on 4 April 1892 by the Queen regent Emma

== House orders ==
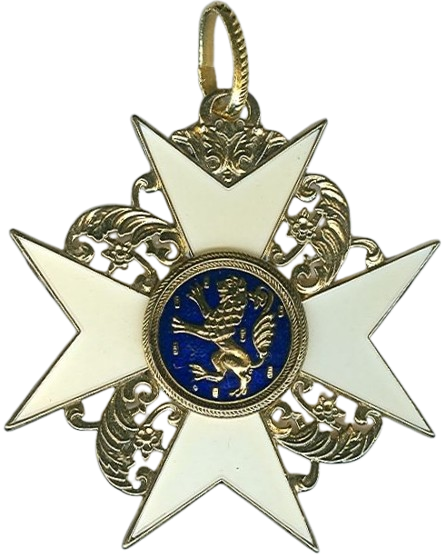
- Order of the Gold Lion of the House of Nassau, founded on 31 March 1858 by King-Grand Duke William III
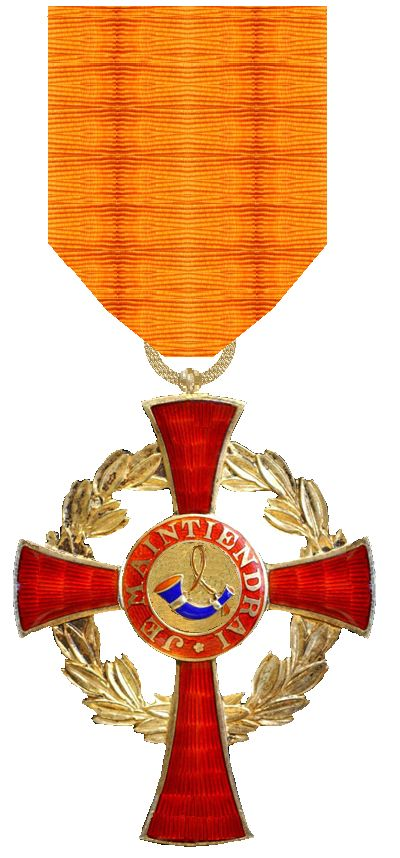
- Order of the House of Orange, instituted by Queen Wilhelmina in 1905, reorganized by Queen Juliana in 1969
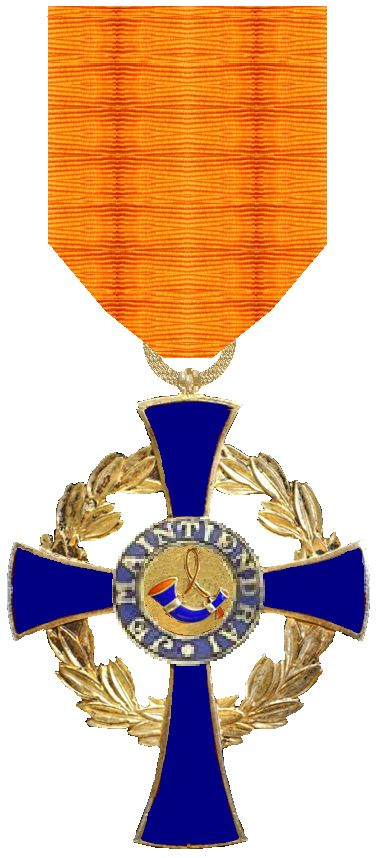
- Order for Loyalty and Merit, established as a separate group of the House Order of Orange by Queen Juliana in 1969
- Medal of Honour for Ingenuity and Entrepreneurship (Eremedaille voor Voortvarendheid en Vernuft)
- Medal of Honour for Art and Science (Eremedaille voor Kunst en Wetenschap)
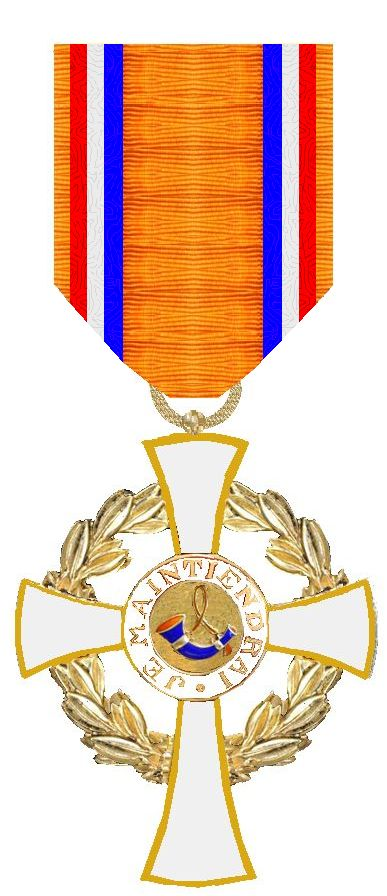
- Order of the Crown, established as a separate group of the House Order of Orange by Queen Juliana in 1969

== State awards ==
=== Awards for bravery ===
- Honorable Mention (Eervolle Vermelding)
- Bronze Lion (Bronzen Leeuw)
- Resistance Star East Asia (Verzetsster Oost-Azië)
- Bronze Cross (Het Bronzen Kruis)
- Cross of Merit (Kruis van Verdienste)
- Airman's Cross (Vliegerkruis)

=== Awards for merit ===
- Medal of the Royal Netherlands Meteorological Institute (Medaille van het Koninklijk Nederlands Meteorologisch Instituut)
- Museum Medal (Erepenning voor Verdiensten jegens Openbare Verzamelingen)
- Flood Disaster Medal (Watersnoodmedaille)
- De Ruyter Medal (De Ruyter-medaille)
- Medal of the Red Cross (Medaille van het Rode Kruis)
- Medal of Recognition 1940-1945 (Erkentelijkheidsmedaille)
- Decoration of Merit in gold, silver or bronze. (Ereteken voor Verdienste)

=== Commemorative awards for military operations ===
- Silver Memorial Cross 1813-15, awarded 1865 (Zilveren Herdenkingskruis)
- Expedition Cross (Ereteken voor Belangrijke Krijgsbedrijven)
- Aceh Medal (Atjeh-medaille)
- Lombok Cross (Lombokkruis)
- War Commemorative Cross (Oorlogsherinneringskruis)
- Resistance Commemorative Cross (Verzetsherdenkingskruis)
- Decoration for Order and Peace (Ereteken voor Orde en Vrede)
- New Guinea Commemorative Cross (Nieuw-Guinea Herinneringskruis)
- Mobilisation War Cross 1940-1945 (Mobilisatie-Oorlogskruis)
- Cross for Law and Liberty, for Korean service 1950-53 (Kruis voor Recht en Vrijheid)
- Commemorative Medal UN Peace Operations (Herinneringsmedaille VN-Vredesoperaties)
- Commemorative Medal Multinational Peace Operations (Herinneringsmedaille Multinationale Vredesoperaties)
- Commemorative Medal Peace Operations (Herinneringsmedaille Vredesoperaties)
- Commemorative Medal for Humanitarian Assistance in Disasters (Herinneringsmedaille voor Humanitaire Hulpverlening bij Rampen)
- Kosovo Medal (Kosovo-medaille)

=== Awards for faithful service ===
- Officers' Cross (Onderscheidingsteken voor Langdurige Dienst als officier)
- Decoration for Long, Honest and Loyal Service in gold, silver or bronze (Onderscheidingsteken voor Langdurige, Eerlijke en Trouwe Dienst)
- Decoration for Loyal Volunteer Service in the Coast Guard (Onderscheidingsteken voor trouwe dienst bij de Militaire Kustwacht)
- Volunteer Medal Public Safety (formerly called Volunteers Medal) (Vrijwilligersmedaille Openbare Orde en Veiligheid)

=== Commemorative medals and awards for skill ===
- Queen Wilhelmina Inauguration Medal, 1898 (Inhuldigingsmedaille 1898)
- Wedding Medal of Queen Wilhelmina and Duke Henry of Mecklenburg-Schwerin, 1901 (Huwelijksmedaille 1901)
- Commemorative Medal of the Second Hague Peace Conference 1907 (Herinneringsmedaille aan de Tweede Internationale Vredesconferentie)
- Royal Silver Wedding Medal, 1926 (Herinneringsmedaille 1926)
- Honor Guard Commemorative Medal, 1933 (Herinneringsmedaille 1933)
- Wedding Medal of Princess Juliana and Prince Bernhard, 1937 (Huwelijksmedaille 1937)
- Queen Juliana Inauguration Medal, 1948 (Inhuldigingsmedaille 1948)
- Royal Silver Wedding Medal of Queen Juliana and Prince Bernhard, 1962 (Herinneringsmedaille 1962)
- Wedding Medal of Princess Beatrix and Claus van Amsberg, 1966 (Huwelijksmedaille 1966)
- Queen Beatrix Inauguration Medal, 1980 (Inhuldigingsmedaille 1980)
- Netherlands Antilles Visit Medal, 1980 (Herinneringsmedaille bezoek aan de Nederlandse Antillen)
- Wedding Medal of Willem-Alexander and Máxima Zorreguieta, 2002 (Huwelijksmedaille 2002)
- King Willem-Alexander Inauguration Medal, 2013 (Inhuldigingsmedaille 2013)
- Caribbean Part of the Kingdom Visit Medal, 2013 (Herinneringsmedaille bezoek in 2013 aan het Caribisch deel van het Koninkrijk)
- Commemorative Medal for State Visits (Herinneringsmedaille Buitenlandse Bezoeken)
- Rietkerk Medal (Rietkerkpenning)
- Navy Foreign Service Medal (Marinemedaille)
- Army Foreign Service Medal (Landmachtmedaille)
- Marechaussee Foreign Service Medal (Marechausseemedaille)
- Air Force Foreign Service Medal (Luchtmachtmedaille)
- Voluntary Police Commemorative Medal 1948–98 (Herinneringsmedaille Vrijwillige Politie)
- Master-Sharpshooter on Rifle of the Royal Navy (Eereteeken voor Meester-Scherpschutter op geweer der Koninklijke Marine)
- Master-Gunner on Rifle of the Royal Navy (Eereteeken voor Meester-Kanonnier der Koninklijke Marine)
- Royal Medal of Shooting Contests (Koninklijke Eereprijs voor Schietwedstrijden)
- Medal for First Class Sharpshooters (Eereteeken voor scherpschutters eerste klasse)
- KNIL (Royal Dutch East Indies Army) awards

== Other officially recognised knightly orders ==
The Dutch government allows the following orders of chivalry to be worn on military uniforms:

- Sovereign Military Order of Malta (Souvereine Militaire Orde van Malta)
- Order of Saint John in the Netherlands (Johanniter Orde in Nederland)
- Teutonic Order, Bailiwick of Utrecht (Ridderlijke Duitsche Orde, Balije van Utrecht)

== Decorations instituted by H.R.H. Prince Bernhard of the Netherlands ==
- Silver Carnation (Zilveren Anjer)
- Order of the Golden Ark (Orde van de Gouden Ark)

== Awards from Dutch private organizations ==
- Carnegie Hero Fund Medal (Medaille van het Carnegie Heldenfonds)
- Mobilisation Cross 1914-1918 (Mobilisatiekruis)
- Air Protection Medal 1940-45 (Luchtbeschermingsmedaille)
- Cross for the Four Day Marches (Vierdaagse Kruis)
- Medal for Proven Athletic Skill of the Dutch Olympic Committee (Medaille voor vaardigheidsproeven van het Nederlands Olympisch Comité)
- National Pentathlon Cross of the Dutch Sports Federation (Nationale Vijfkampkruis van de Nederlandse Sport Federatie)
- Military Performance Event Cross of the Royal Dutch Reserve Officers Association (Kruis van de Koninklijke Vereniging van Nederlandse Reserve-Officieren voor de Militaire Prestatietocht)
- Eleven cities cross, medal for those who completed the Eleven cities long-distance skating tour (Elfstedenkruis)

== Awards from international organizations ==
- United Nations Medal
- North Atlantic Treaty Organization Medal
- Western European Union Medal
- Multinational Force and Observers Medal
- European Community Monitor Mission Medal
- CSDP Medal
- Baltic Air Policing Medal

== Literature and sources ==
- W.F. Bax, "Ridderorden, eereteekenen, draagteekens en penningen, betreffende de Weermacht van Nederland en Koloniën (1813-heden)", 1973
- H.G. Meijer, C.P. Mulder en B.W. Wagenaar, "Orders and Decorations of the Netherlands", 1984
- C.H. Evers, "Onderscheidingen", 2001
- J.H. van Zelm van Eldik, "Moed en Trouw", 2003
- O Schutte, De Orde van de Unie", 1985
