= Silver Memorial Cross, 1813–1815 =

Dutch campaign medal for Napoleonic wars

Silver Memorial Cross 1813–1815 Zilveren Herdenkingskruis 1813–1815
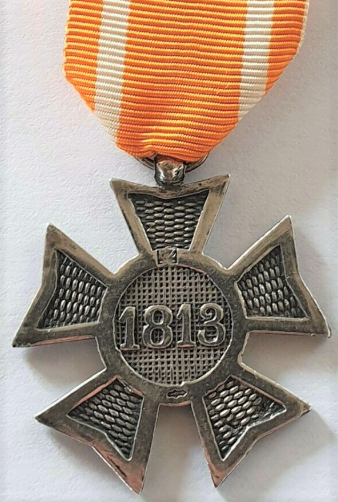
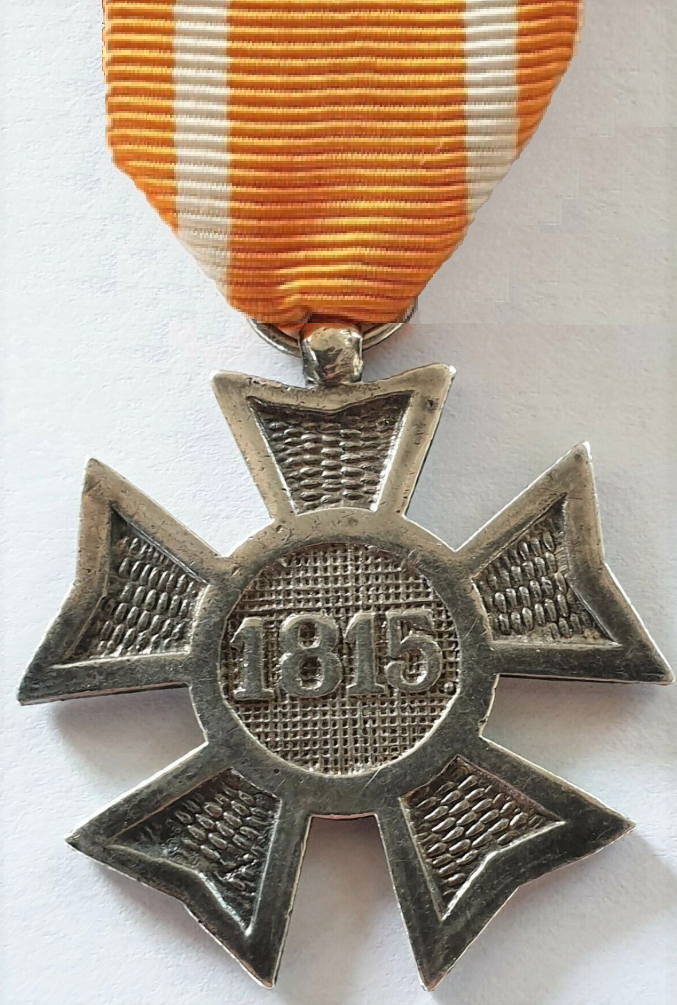
- Obverse and reverse of the medal
- Type: Campaign medal
- Awarded for: Campaign service
- Presented by: Kingdom of the Netherlands
- Eligibility: Surviving veterans
- Campaign(s): Napoleonic Wars, 1813–15; Waterloo campaign, 1815
- Established: 1865
- Total: Ca. 5,000
- Medal ribbon

The Silver Memorial Cross 1813–1815, (Dutch: Zilveren Herdenkingskruis 1813–1815) was a campaign medal instituted by King William III of the Netherlands on 10 May 1865. It was awarded to surviving veterans of the Dutch armed forces who, between 1813 and 1815, helped to restore Dutch independence. This included participating in the 1814 campaign to end the occupation of the Netherlands by Napoleon's French forces, and in the final Hundred Days campaign of 1815, including the battles of Quatre Bras and Waterloo.

The first Silver Memorial Crosses were presented on 27 June 1865 on the 50th anniversary of the founding of the Military Order of William. Of the approximately 30,000 who took part in the relevant campaigns, about 5,000 veterans survived to receive the cross.

The decoration is a five-armed silver cross, 35 mm at its widest point. In the centre of the cross is a medallion inscribed with the year '1813' on the obverse and '1815' on the reverse. It was worn on the left breast from a 27.5 mm wide silk ribbon of orange with a white stripe to towards each edge.

== See also ==
- Orders, decorations, and medals of the Netherlands
