= Medal of the Red Cross (Netherlands) =

Civil decoration of the Netherlands for service to the Dutch Red Cross

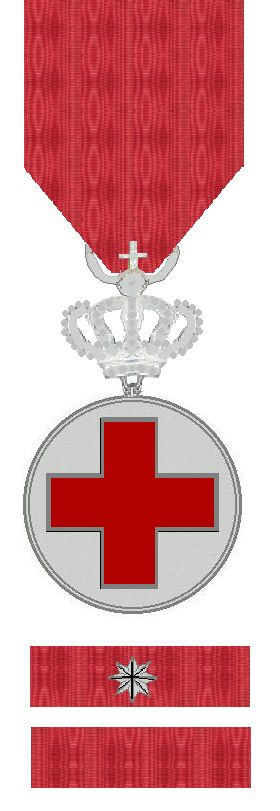
- The medal and the ribbon bar (silver star is indicating a clasp)
- Type: Civil decoration
- Presented by: Kingdom of the Netherlands
- Status: Not currently awarded
- Established: 5 October 1910

Precedence
- Next (higher): Flood disaster Medal
- Next (lower): Medal of Recognition

The Medal of the Red Cross is a royal decoration of the Kingdom of the Netherlands to be awarded for dedication and important services to the Netherlands Red Cross.

The medal is classed as an official Dutch royal decoration as it was not created by the Netherlands or international Red Cross, but by royal decree on 5 October 1910 by the Dutch government.

It was last awarded in 1967.

== Sources ==
- Jhr. G.M. Verspyck, "Het Nederlandsche Roode Kruis (1867-1967)", The Hague, 1967
- H.G. Meijer, C.P. Mulder en B.W. Wagenaar, "Orders and Decorations of The Netherlands", 1984
