= Commemorative Medal for Humanitarian Assistance in Disasters =

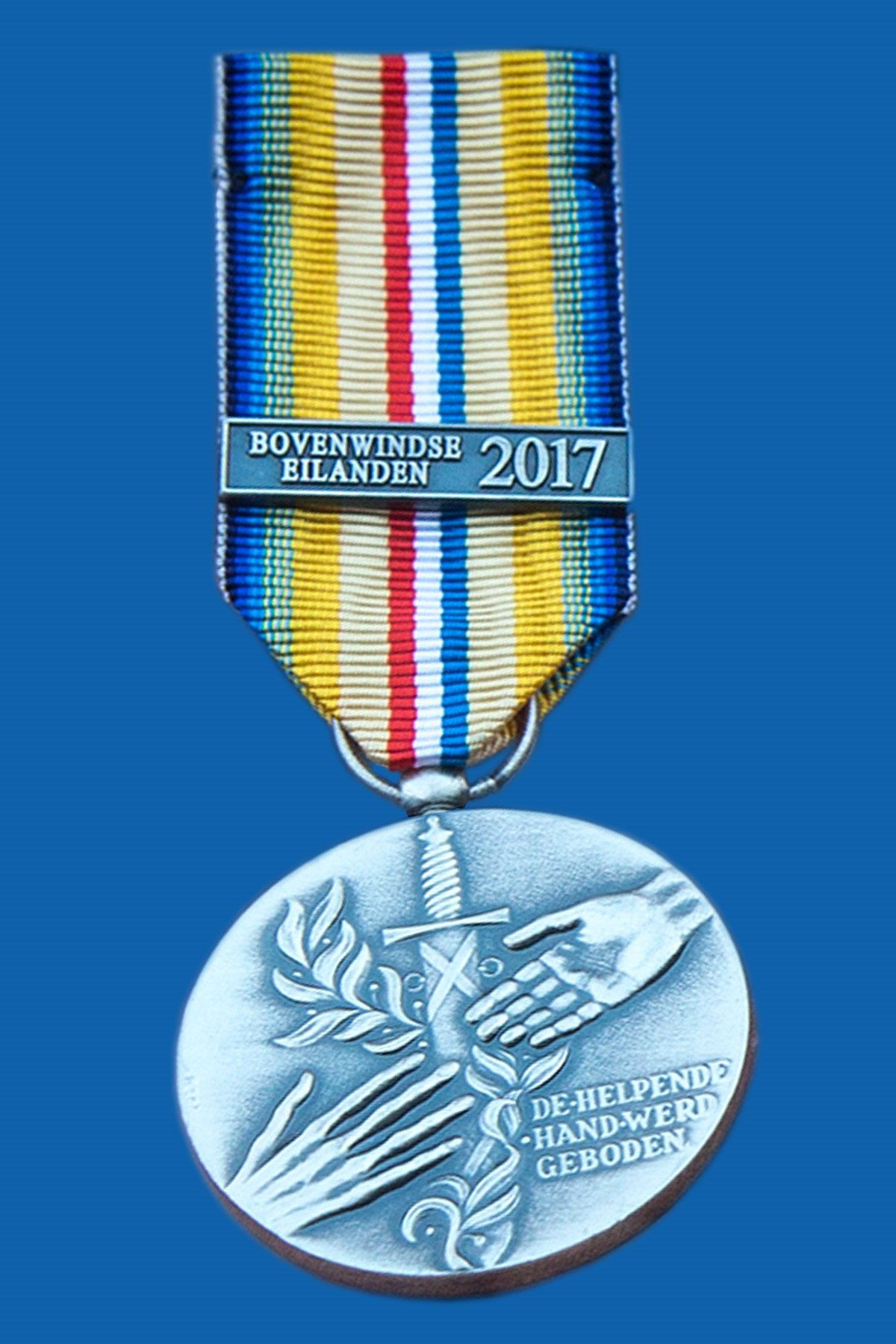
- Obverse of the medal with Windward Islands clasp
- Type: Military service decoration
- Awarded for: Service in designated disaster relief operations
- Presented by: the Kingdom of the Netherlands
- Established: 1971
- Undress Ribbon with a single clasp

Precedence
- Next (higher): Commemorative Medal Multinational Peace Operations
- Next (lower): Kosovo Medal

The Commemorative Medal for Humanitarian Assistance in Disasters (Dutch: Herinneringsmedaille voor Humanitaire Hulpverlening bij Rampen) originally called the Disaster Brigade Commemorative Medal (Dutch: Herinneringsmedaille Rampenbrigade) is a military medal of the Netherlands.

== History ==
The medal was established by Royal Decree on 17 August 1971 originally to recognize the action of soldiers of the Royal Netherlands Navy, Royal Netherlands Army and the Royal Netherlands Air Force in Tunisia. There was no available medal to reward this action, which was not organized by the United Nations or another international organization, with an award. The medal was awarded to persons who, according to the Royal Decree, "forming part of or together with the armed forces, actually participated in the relief effort on the spot of a disaster area designated by the Minister of Defence in employment".

In the Royal Decree of 1 February 2000, "re-establishing the decree establishing the Commemorative Medal for Humanitarian Aid in Disasters", the Disaster Brigade Commemorative Medal was renamed, retaining the same medal with the same ribbon. The clasps could continue to be worn on the ribbon in the future and newly set clasps would be applied to the ribbon.

== Clasps ==
The medal is always awarded with a clasp denoting the operation under which the medal is awarded. The following are the clasps for the medal:

- TUNESIË 1969/1970 - Service by the Royal Netherlands Navy, Royal Netherlands Army and the Royal Netherlands Air Force from 4 November 1969 to 8 March 1970 to the Republic of Tunisia, in order to alleviate the consequences of the flood disaster that hit that country in the autumn of 1969.
- SOEDAN 1974 - Food distribution aid by soldiers of the Royal Netherlands Army from September to October 1974 in the drought areas in Sudan.
- RWANDA 1994 - Relief operations for Rwandan refugees of the Great Lakes refugee crisis from August to September 1994 in Zaire.
- Albanië 1999 - Dutch military assistance to the Kosovo refugees in Albania from April to August 1999.
- Tsunami 2004 - Military aid operations for 2004 Indian Ocean earthquake and tsunami from December 2004 to December 2005. Also, to members of the Disaster Identification Team of the National Police Force who have actually participated in the assistance in the affected overseas areas.
- Pakistan 2005 - Relief operation for the victims of the earthquake in Pakistan in the period 9 October 2005 to 15 February 2006.
- Haïti 2010 - Dutch military assistance operation in relief of the 2010 Haiti earthquake from 12 January 2010 to 24 February 2010.
- West-Afrika 2014 - Dutch military assistance operations to aid victims of the Western African Ebola virus epidemic from 6 November 2014 to 24 January 2015.
- DOMINICA 2015 - Relief operation for Tropical Storm Erika on Dominica from 3 September 2015 to 22 September 2015.
- EGEÏSCHE ZEE 2016 - Migrants rescue on and around the Aegean Sea from 4 January 2016.
- LIBISCHE ZEE 2016 - Migrant rescue in the Mediterranean Sea from 7 March 2016 to 15 July 2016.
- HAÏTI 2016 - Hurricane Matthew relief operations in Haiti from 11 October 2016 to 27 October 2016.
- BOVENWINDSE EILANDEN 2017 - Hurricane Irma relief operations on St. Maarten, Saba, and St. Eustatius and Hurricane Maria on Dominica from 7 September 2017 to 25 October 2017.
