= Honorary Medal for Merits toward Museum Collections =

Museum Medal
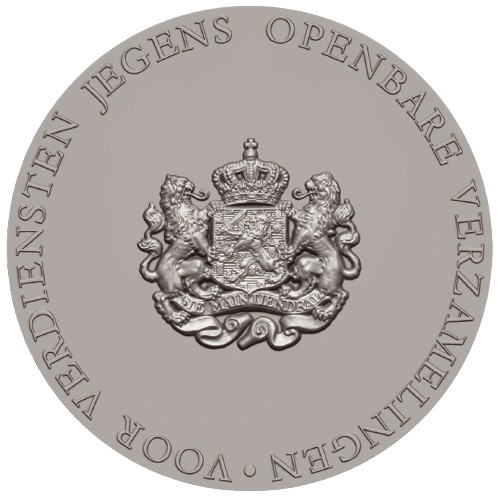
- The medal in silver
- Type: Civil decoration, with degrees gold, silver and bronze
- Presented by: Kingdom of the Netherlands
- Status: Currently awarded
- Established: 26 June 1817
- Ribbon bar of the golden Dutch Museum Medal

Precedence
- Next (higher): De Ruyter Medal
- Next (lower): Flood disaster Medal

The Honorary Medal for Merits toward Museum Collections (Dutch: Erepenning voor Verdiensten jegens Openbare Verzamelingen), also known as the Museum Medal (Dutch: Museummedaille), is one of the oldest civil decorations of the Netherlands. It was created by royal decree on 26 June 1817 by King William I of the Netherlands. The decree describes the following: "Erepenning voor blijken van belangstelling in 's Rijksverzamelingen door schenking betoond" (English: an honorary medal for appearance of interest in the state collection by donation shown). The medal is awarded in gold, silver or bronze as a token of appreciation to those who "aan hen, die enig boek- of kunstwerk, dat de vrucht van hun arbeid was, de Koning deden toekomen" (English: for those, who donate to the Dutch monarch any works of art, that were collected with much effort).

By royal decree, on 5 May 1877, eligibility for this award was extended by King William III of the Netherlands, with the description "aan hen, die door het aanbieden van belangrijke geschenken of op andere wijze zich verdienstelijk hebben gemaakt ten opzichte van de verschillende wetenschappelijke en kunstverzamelingen des Rijks" (English: to those who donated important works of art to the state museums or who showed praiseworthy acts regarding the different scientific collections or art collection of the state museums). Due to this description, the medal obtained its current official name. However, since the end of the 19th century, this decoration is primarily known as the "Museum Medal". Up until 1897, the honorary medal was only a standing decoration, when Queen Wilhelmina of the Netherlands declared that the medal could be worn suspended from a ribbon.

Eligibility for this award was once again extending, by Queen Wilhelmina, on 28 October 1919 with the description "verdiensten jegens gemeentelijke (openbare) verzamelingen" (English: merit towards community (public) collections). What was initially a medal for generous donors became now an official royal award for merit. Queen Juliana of the Netherlands decided by royal decree on 26 July 1952 that the shape of the medal and ribbon should be changed. The current ribbon is orange with two red lines descending down the middle. A ribbon bar is also given with the award, with a palm branch device in either gold or silver for recipients of the gold or silver versions of the medal, respectively. Queen Beatrix of the Netherlands later changed the composition of the medallion, and is now depicted on the obverse of the medal.

== Notable recipients ==
- Willem, Baron van Dedem - art collector
- Rudi Fuchs - Dutch art historian and former director of the Stedelijk Museum Amsterdam
- Dollie Defesche-Bakker - widow of Pieter Defesche, a former Dutch visual artist
- Rosetta C. Musaph-Andriesse - former director of the Jewish Historical Museum Amsterdam
- A.W. Swaanswijk-Koek - widow of Lucebert, a former Dutch painter
- Johan Wertheim - a Dutch sculptor
- A.R. Wittop Koning - a Dutch architect
