= Medal of Recognition 1940–1945 =

Medal of Recognition
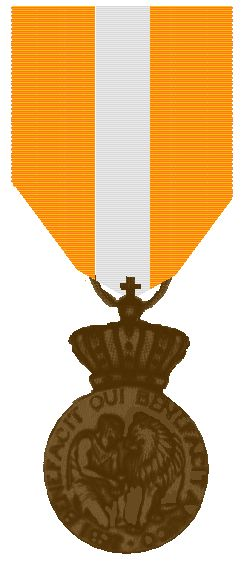
- The bronze Medal of Recognition 1940–1945
- Type: Civil decoration, with degrees silver and bronze
- Presented by: Kingdom of the Netherlands
- Status: Still living recipients, but not awarded anymore
- Established: 9 February 1946
- Ribbon bar of the silver Medal of Recognition

Precedence
- Next (higher): Medal of the Red Cross
- Next (lower): Decoration of Merit

The Medal of Recognition 1940–1945 (Dutch: Erkentelijkheidsmedaille 1940–1945) was a medal of the Kingdom of the Netherlands that was established by Royal Decree on 9 February 1946. The decoration was of two classes, silver and bronze, and was awarded to those who aided the Dutch during the period of World War II, or afterwards helped relieve those who had suffered from the German occupation. Dutch prisoners of war who managed to escape from Colditz Castle were awarded the medal of recognition.

== Design ==
The decoration was designed as a circular medal 29 millimetres in diameter and exists in two classes, silver and bronze. On the front Androcles is portrayed taking the thorn from the lion's paw. The choice of motif was guided by the fact that the lion is the royal emblem of the Netherlands and the story was once commonly cited as an example of enduring gratitude. The inscription round the front edge reads SIBI BENEFACIT QUI BENEFACIT AMICO (Latin for 'He benefits himself who benefits a friend'). On the reverse of the medal the inscription reads POPULUS BATAVUS GRATO ANIMO (Latin for 'With the gratitude of the Dutch people'). The medal's ribbon is orange with a broad white stripe down the middle, on which there is a small silver or bronze crown according to class.
