= The Senses (Rembrandt) =

Series of five paintings by Rembrandt

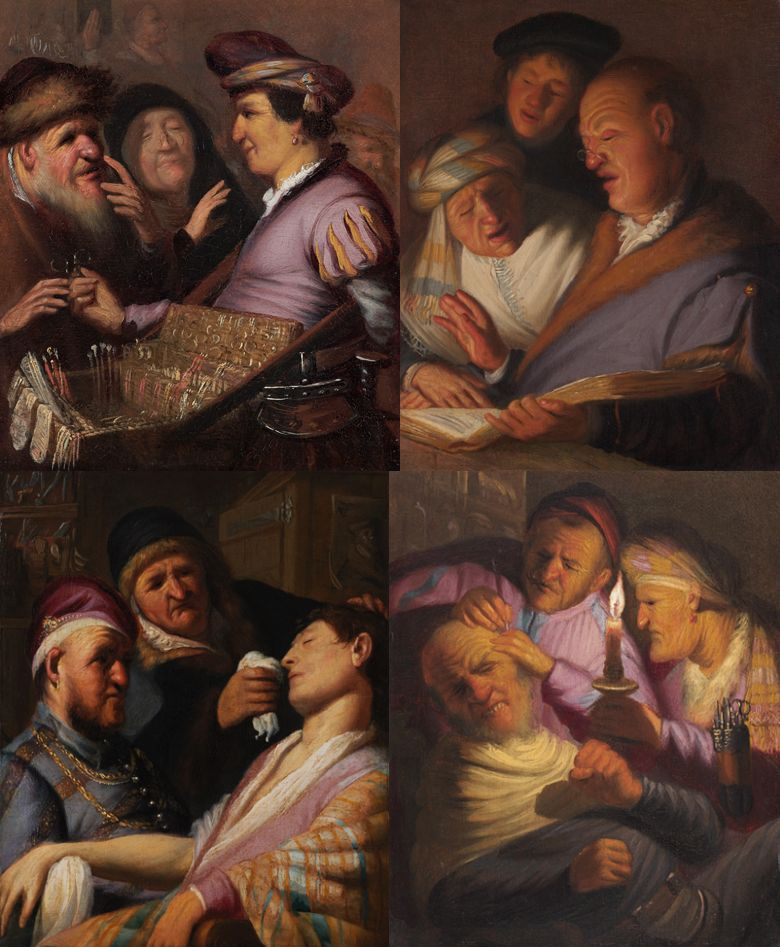
The four known paintings

The Senses is a series of five oil paintings, completed c. 1624 or 1625 by Rembrandt, depicting the five senses. The whereabouts of one, representing the sense of taste, is unknown. Another, representing smell, was only re-identified in 2015.

Rembrandt was only around eighteen years old when the paintings were made; they are his earliest surviving works, and are of identical size.

In about the 1720s the four known paintings were extended, but only one, Smell, retains the additions and those are now concealed by its frame, so that it appears to retain its original format.

Three of the extant paintings, those belonging to the Leiden Collection, were reunited for the first time in public at the Getty Center, in Los Angeles, United States from May to August 2016, and then all four were shown from September to November 2016 at the Ashmolean Museum in Oxford, England. The fifth painting was represented by an empty frame.

The full set includes:

1. A Pedlar Selling Spectacles (Allegory of Sight)
2. Three Singers (Allegory of Hearing)
3. Unconscious Patient (Allegory of Smell)
4. Stone Operation (Allegory of Touch)
5. (Allegory of Taste)

== The paintings ==
The paintings are rendered in oil, on oak panels, and measure 21 by 18 centimetres (8.3 by 7.1 in).

Each of the known paintings depicts three people.

=== Sight ===
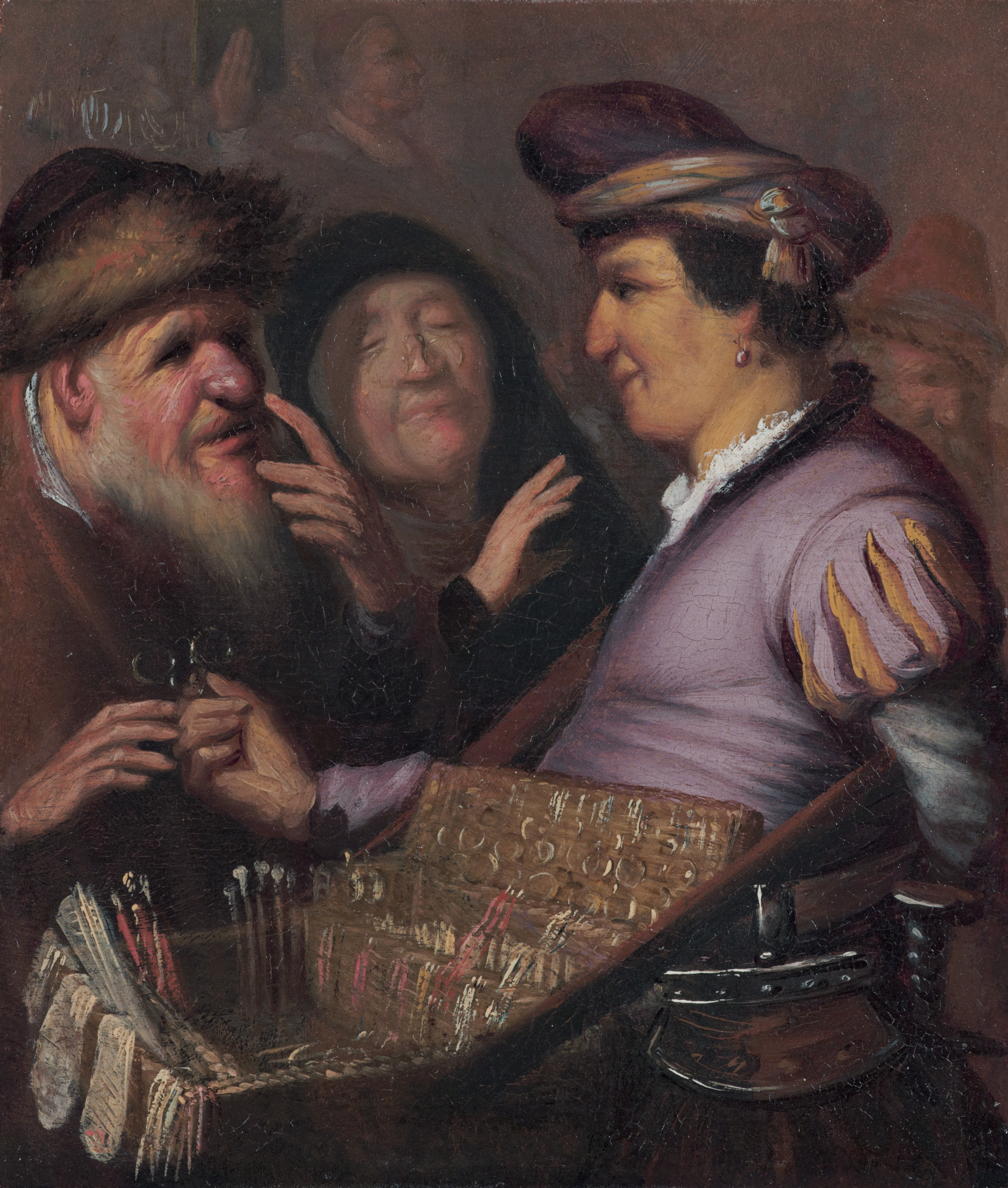
A Pedlar Selling Spectacles (Allegory of Sight)

A Pedlar Selling Spectacles shows an elderly couple buying a pair of pince-nez spectacles from a pedlar. The work is in the collection of the Lakenhal Museum, Leiden, in the Netherlands.

The scene plays on the Dutch idiom "selling someone glasses" meaning to deceive them.

An x-ray shows that the panel was previously used for a painting of a female nude.

=== Hearing ===
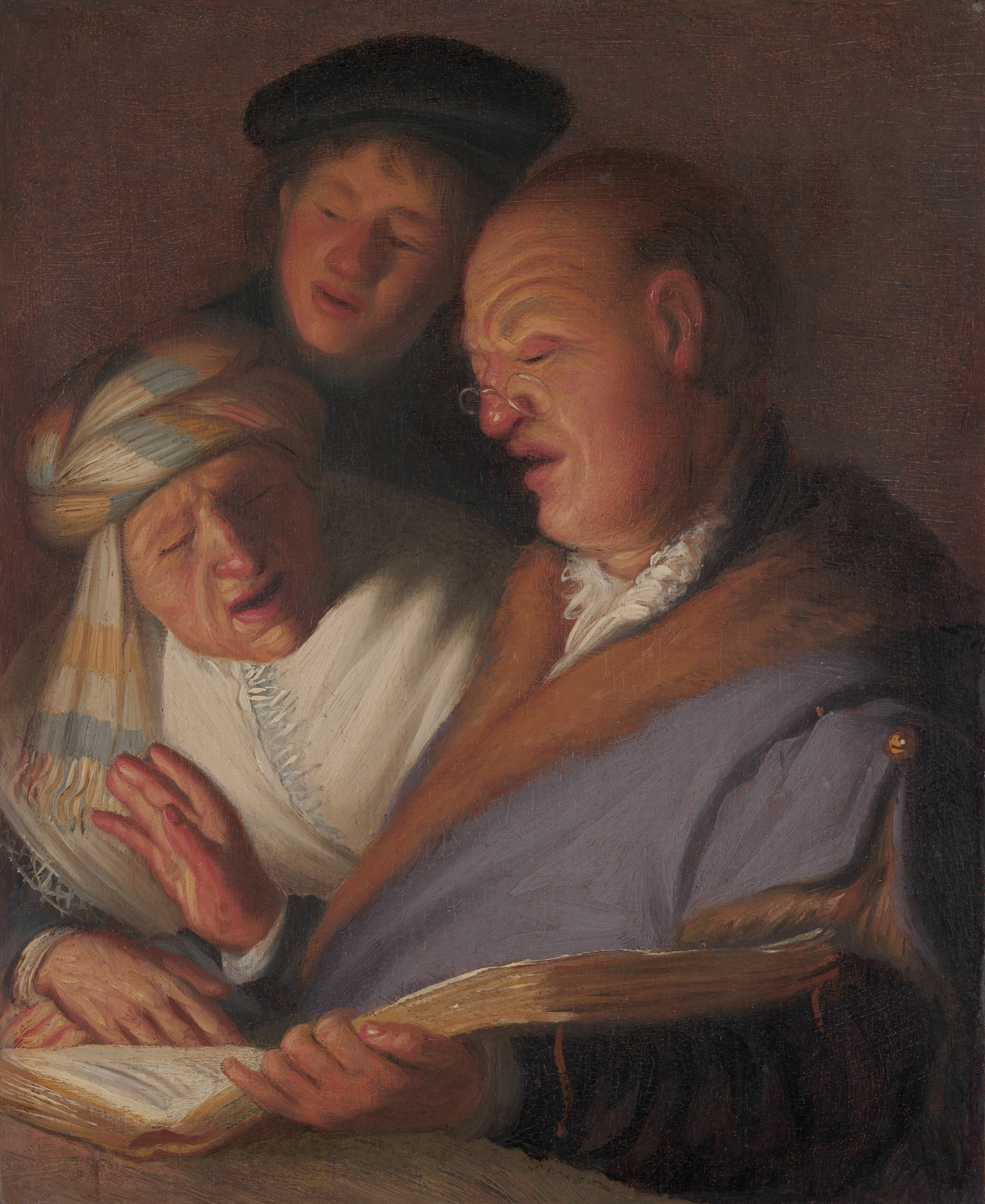
Three Singers (Allegory of Hearing)

Three Singers depicts a man and his elderly parents, singing in candlelight. It refers to various Dutch proverbs which contrast the strong voices of young people with those of the elderly, which are more unsteady.

The work is in the private Leiden Collection of New York, United States. It was previously owned by Baron Willem van Dedem, who had it conserved and the later extensions removed, thereby resolving its attribution.

=== Smell ===
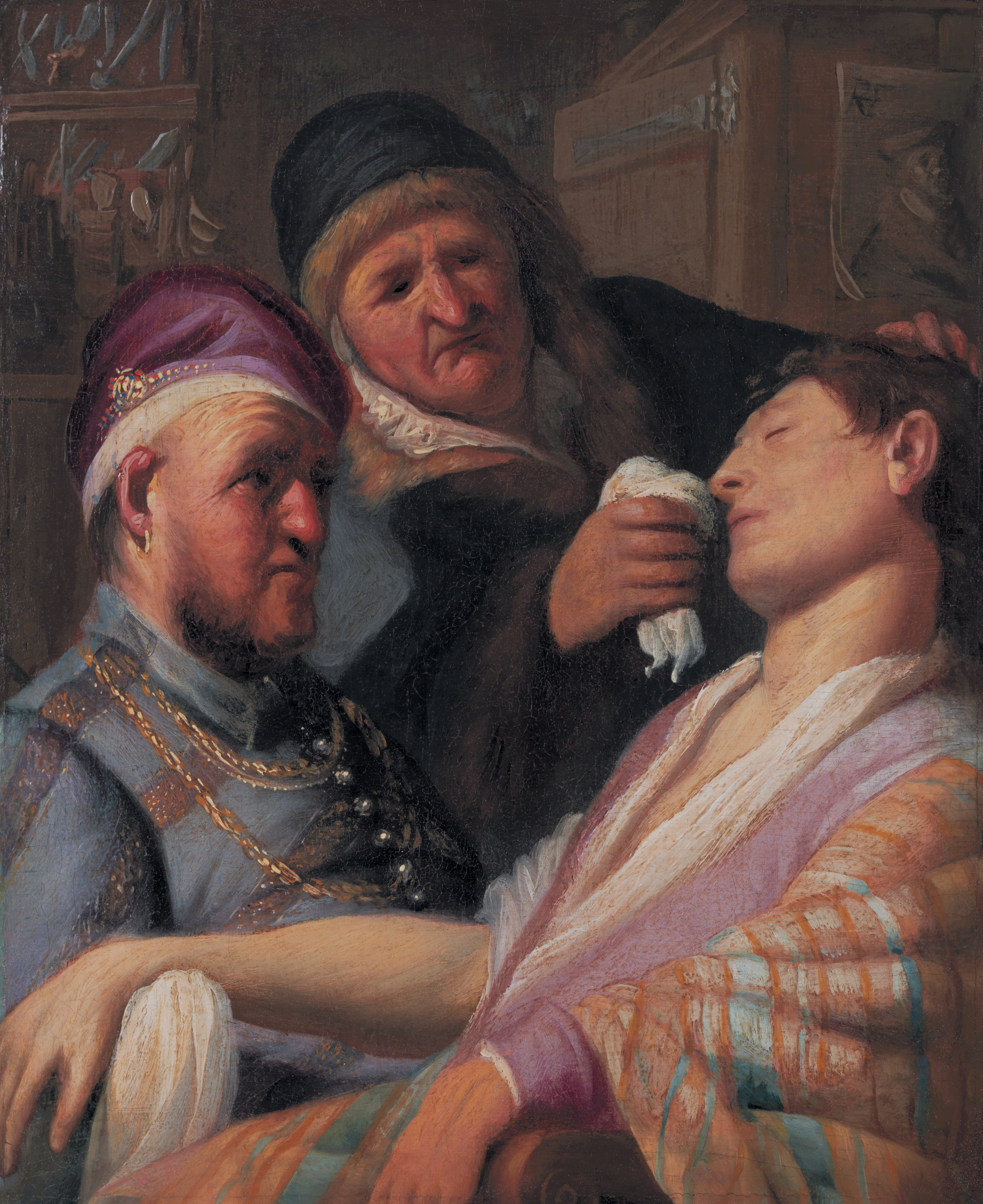
Unconscious Patient (Allegory of Smell)

Unconscious Patient depicts a woman attempting to revive a man with smelling salts, as a barber-surgeon watches. Long missing, it was identified when offered for auction in New Jersey, United States, in 2015, with an estimate of $US500-800, titled "Oil on Board, Triple Portrait with Lady Fainting" and catalogued as "Continental School, 19thC., Appears unsigned", with no named artist, and as having "paint loss, some restoration to paint, [and] wood cracks". It eventually sold, to the Leiden Collection, for an unknown sum, after achieving $870,000 at the auction, and was subsequently cleaned, revealing its "brilliant palette, descriptive brushwork, and tightly arranged figures".

This is in fact the only one of the known paintings to be signed, with the monogram RHF ("Rembrandt Harmenszoon fecit", meaning "Rembrandt, son of Harmen, made this").

=== Touch ===
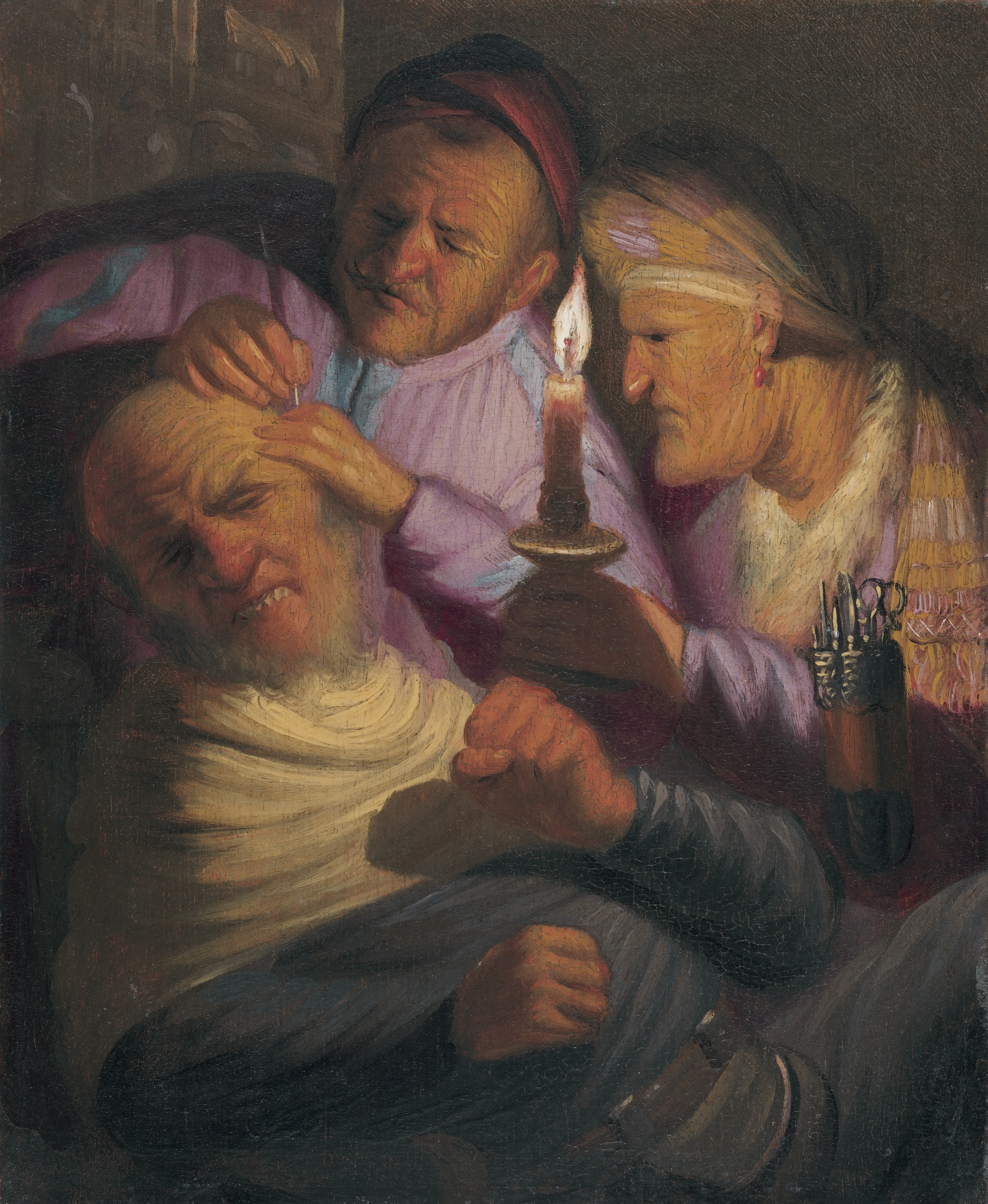
Stone Operation (Allegory of Touch)

Stone Operation shows a man being operated on by a barber-surgeon watched by the latter's assistant. This work is again in the Leiden Collection. "Stone removal" operations were offered to patients as supposed cure for headaches. Rembrandt is alluding to the Dutch idiom "cutting out a stone", meaning to fool someone. It is possible that the model for the barber-surgeon was Rembrandt's father.

=== Taste ===
The whereabouts of this work, and what it depicts, are not known.

== See also ==
- List of paintings by Rembrandt
