= New Guinea Commemorative Cross =

New Guinea Commemorative Cross Nieuw-Guinea Herinneringskruis
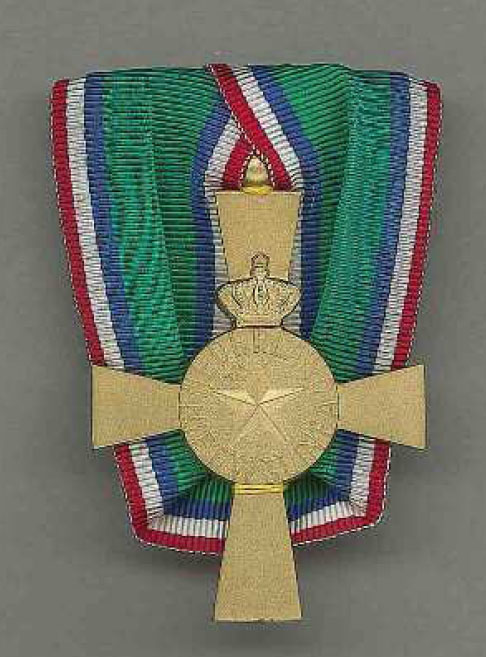
- Obverse of the New Guinea Commemorative Cross
- Type: Military campaign decoration
- Awarded for: Service in Dutch New Guinea
- Presented by: the Kingdom of the Netherlands
- Status: No longer awarded
- Established: 29 September 1962
- Undress Ribbon for 1962 clasp

Precedence
- Next (higher): Decoration for Order and Peace
- Next (lower): Mobilisation War Cross

The New Guinea Commemorative Cross (Dutch: Nieuw-Guinea Herinneringskruis) is a military award of the Netherlands. The New Guinea Commemorative Cross was instituted by Queen Juliana by Royal Decree on 29 September 1962. The medal was awarded to members of the Netherlands Armed Forces the Royal Netherlands East Indies Army, to recognize at least three months of service in Dutch New Guinea and adjacent waters between 28 December 1949 and 23 November 1962. Recipients who were engaged in hostile military action during the Indonesian campaign of infiltration were awarded a clasp with the year 1962.

== Criteria ==
The New Guinea Commemorative Cross was awarded to members of the Netherlands Armed Forces and the Royal Netherlands East Indies Army. To qualify, service must have been for at least three months between 28 December 1949 and 23 November 1962 in Dutch New Guinea or the surrounding waters. Individuals whose service qualified them for a clasp did not have to serve the full three months to be eligible for the medal.

Initially, the cross was only awarded for service in 1962. However in 1992, the award period was revised to cover service from 1958 to 1962. In 1994, it was changed again to cover 1949 to 1962.

== Appearance ==
The New Guinea Commemorative Cross is a four-armed cross of gold-coloured metal. The vertical arms are longer than the horizontal arms. On the obverse of the cross centered at the intersection of the arms is a circular medallion with faceted five-pointed star, in relief. Surrounding the star are the words NEDERLAND NIEUW GUINEA (Netherlands New Guinea). The medallion is surmounted by the royal crown. On the reverse of the cross is a corresponding circular medallion of equal size bearing the Dutch lion rampant, also surmounted by a royal crown.

The cross hangs from a silk ribbon with narrow stripes of red at the edges, white, and blue bordering the green central stripe. On the full sized medal, the clasp is worn centered on the suspension ribbon, above the cross. Those who are entitled to the clasp were a single five-pointed gold star on the undress ribbon, when medals are not worn.
