= Flood Disaster Medal =

Dutch military award

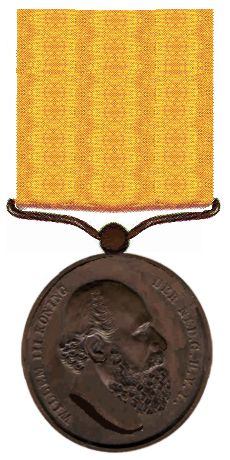
- The bronze medal
- Type: Civil decoration, with degrees silver and bronze
- Presented by: Kingdom of the Netherlands
- Status: Not currently awarded
- Established: 27 March 1855
- The ribbon bar of a bronze medal

Precedence
- Next (higher): Museum Medal
- Next (lower): Medal of the Red Cross

The Decoration for acknowledgement of excellent deeds performed during a flood disaster (Dutch: Onderscheidingsteken ter erkenning van uitstekende daden bij watersnood verricht), usually called Flood disaster Medal (Dutch: Watersnoodmedaille), was created by royal decree on 27 March 1855 by King William III of the Netherlands. The medal is intended for those civilians who have shown zeal, courage, leadership, and self-sacrifice during the event of a flood disaster.
