= Rudi Fuchs =

Dutch art historian and curator (1942–2026)

- Fuchs (1980s)
- Born: Rudolf Herman Fuchs; 28 April 1942; Eindhoven, German-occupied Netherlands
- Died: 25 October 2026 (aged 84); Amsterdam, Netherlands
- Education: Leiden University
- Occupations: Author; art critic

Rudolf Herman Fuchs (28 April 1942 – 25 October 2026) was a Dutch art historian and curator.

== Background ==
Rudolf Herman Fuchs was born in Eindhoven on 28 April 1942. He studied art history from 1967 to 1975 at Leiden University, after which he became a museum director and critic. According to one source "he represents the dying type of museum director who, like a teacher, guides his visitors through the wonderful world of art."

Fuchs had twin sons (born 1970). He lived in Amsterdam and Norfolk. Fuchs died in Amsterdam on 25 October 2026, at the age of 84.

== Career ==
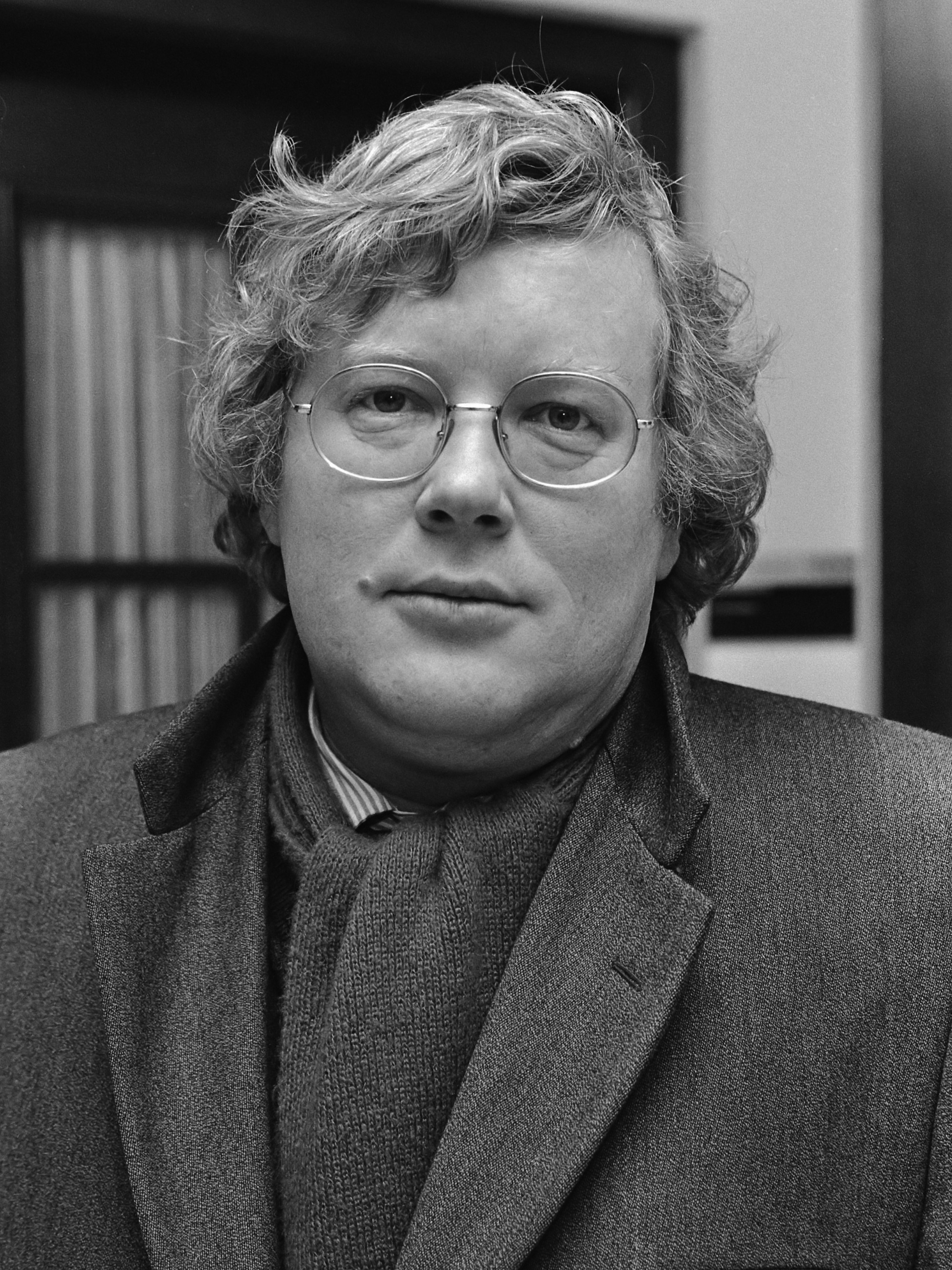
Rudi Fuchs (1985)

In 1975, Fuchs became director of the Van Abbemuseum in Eindhoven. At that time he was the youngest director of a museum in the Netherlands. According to the Van Abbemuseum, it was the start of a career that would lead to him "becoming one of Europe's leading museum directors." Unlike his immediate predecessors at the museum, Fuchs concentrated on contemporary European art (as opposed to contemporary American art) and focused on collections and purchases of artists from German, Austria and Italy.

In 1982, he was one of the organisers and the artistic director of Documenta 7 in Kassel in Germany.

Between 1984 and 1991 Fuchs was director of the Rivoli Castle Museum in Turin.

Between 1987 and 1993 he was director of the Gemeentemuseum in The Hague, leaving a deficit of over four million guilders. He later admitted "to having no talent for administrative affairs."

In February 1993 he became director of the Stedelijk Museum in Amsterdam. At first he was general director, later director of art. He worked at the museum until 1 January 2003. His farewell was overshadowed by suspicions concerning the possible non payment of import duties from the US over four paintings and a sculpture by the artist Karel Appel. He returned to work at the Stedelijk as a guest curator for the 2016 exhibition Excitement, "a survey of contemporary art produced over the last fifty years, including abstract and figurative painting, and works that have become highlights in the collections of the Stedelijk, Van Abbemuseum and the Gemeentemuseum Den Haag."

Fuchs also worked as a lecturer at the University of Amsterdam and independent writer. He published widely on art as an author and art critic.

== Awards and decorations ==
Fuchs received the following awards and decorations:

- Knight in the Order of St. Olav (1996)
- Knight in the Order of the Netherlands Lion (1998)
- Commander in the Order of Merit of the Italian Republic (1998)
- Commander in the Order of the Oak Crown (1999)
- Officer in the Order of Merit of the Federal Republic of Germany (2002)
- Honorary Medal for Merits toward Museum Collections (2004)
- Honorary Medal for Art and Science (2007)
