= Willem van Dedem =

Baron Willem van Dedem
- Born: 1929
- Died: 26 November 2015 (aged 86)
- Occupation: Businessman
- Known for: Art collecting; Philanthropy
- Awards: Museum Medal; Officer's Cross of the Order of Orange-Nassau

Baron Willem van Dedem, also styled as Willem, Baron van Dedem, (1929–2015) was a Dutch businessman, art collector, art historian and philanthropist. He donated artworks to the National Gallery in London, the Rijksmuseum and the Mauritshuis.

After donating five works to the Mauritshuis, he was awarded both the Museum Medal and the Officer's Cross of the Order of Orange-Nassau.

He was president of the board of The European Fine Art Fair (TEFAF).

His art collection was catalogued in a 2002 book by Peter C. Sutton. A 2012 supplement by Sutton described fifteen later additions. At various times, the collection included works by Rembrandt, Pieter Claesz and Adriaen Coorte.

van Dedem died on 26 November 2015. His wife Ronny, who survived him, is an artist. They had lived for many years in London. His great uncle was the shipping magnate Daniel George van Beuningen.

== Collection ==
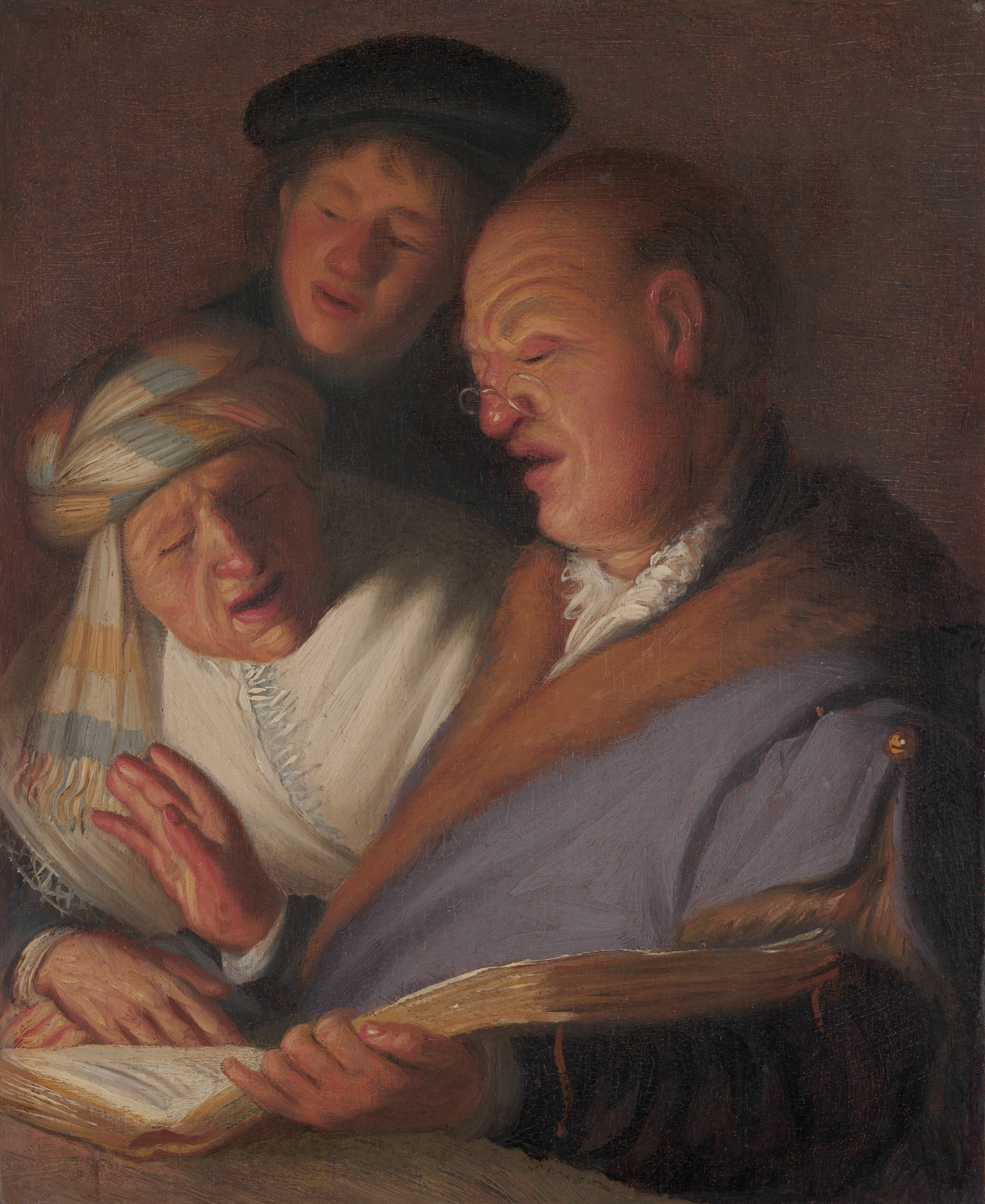
van Dedem sold Rembrandt's Three Singers (pictured) in order to buy Jan van de Cappelle's A Calm Sea with Ships near the Shore.

Works owned by van Dedem included:

- The Adoration of the Magi (1617), Pieter Brueghel the Younger
- Christ with the Woman Taken in Adultery (1628), Pieter Brueghel the Younger
- A Calm Sea with Ships near the Shore (c. 1624/5–79), Jan van de Cappelle
- Still Life with Tazza (1636), Pieter Claesz
- Still Life of a Bowl of Wild Strawberries (1696), Adriaen Coorte
- Still Life with Fruit and Wine Glasses on a Silver Plate, Willem Kalf
- A Young Woman Seated at a Table, Eating (c. 1657), Gabriel Metsu
- Brazilian Landscape with a House under Construction, Frans Post
- Three Singers (Allegory of Hearing) (1624 or 1625), Rembrandt
- Winter Landscape at Arnhem, Salomon van Ruysdael
- Peasants Dancing outside a Bohemian Inn, Roelant Savery
- Interior of a Gothis Protestant Church (1692), Emanuel de Witte
