= Star for Loyalty and Merit =

The Star for Loyalty and Merit (Dutch: Ster voor Trouw en Verdienste) was a civilian award established on 1 January 1894 by Governor-General Carel Herman Aart van der Wijck of the Dutch East Indies. The star replaced the old Medal for Civil Merit, which had limited prestige and status according to the Netherlands government. The star was awarded in gold to "significant and meritorious" natives, and in silver to village chiefs and leaders of the "Eastern foreigner" (i.e. Chinese) communities. Dutch (Europeans) were not eligible to receive the star.

The star was considered the colonial equivalent of the Order of the Netherlands Lion (or at least the "Brother" grade associated with the Order), as well as the medals and the Knight's Cross of the Order of Orange-Nassau.

The star ceased to be awarded after 1949.

== Grades ==
The Star for Loyalty and Merit originally had four grades:

- Great Gold Star
- Small Gold Star
- Silver Star
- Bronze Star

On January 4, 1924, Governor-General Dirk Fock created a fifth grade, the Great Silver Star, ranked immediately after the Small Gold Star; the old Silver Star was renamed the Small Silver Star thereafter.

== Insignia ==
Despite the "Great" and "Small" nomenclature, the five grades of the star were all equal in size, consisted of a badge in the form of a 12-pointed star with straight rays, suspended from a ribbon worn on the left chest:

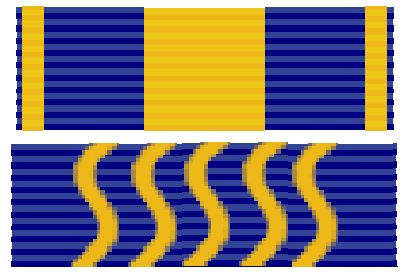
oude en nieuwe batons

- The Great Gold Star: the obverse disc featured a golden Dutch Lion on a blue enamel background, surrounded by a golden wreath and topped by a golden crown. The reverse disc featured the golden letters "TROUW EN VERDIENSTE" (Loyalty and Merit) on a blue enamel background.

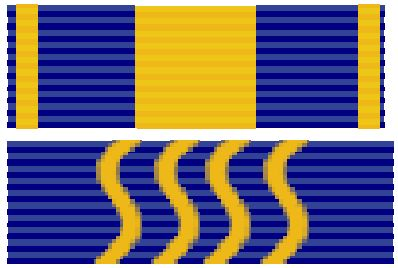
oude en nieuwe batons

- The Small Gold Star: the obverse disc featured a golden Coat of arms of the Netherlands on a golden background. The reverse disc was the same as the Great Gold Star.

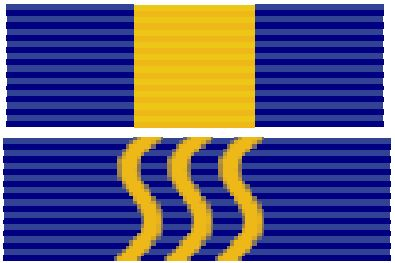
oude en nieuwe batons

- The Great Silver Star: the obverse disc featured a golden Dutch Lion on a blue enamel background, surrounded by a silver wreath and topped by a silver crown. The reverse disc featured the silver letters "TROUW EN VERDIENSTE" (Loyalty and Merit) on a blue enamel background.

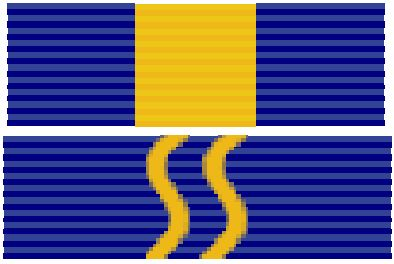
oude en nieuwe batons

- The Small Silver Star: the obverse disc featured a silver Coat of arms of the Netherlands on a silver background. The reverse disc was the same as the Great Silver Star.

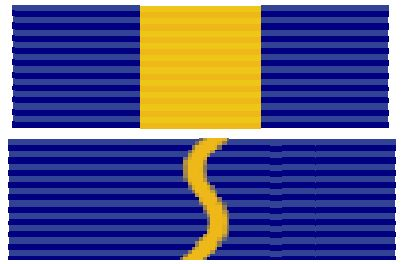
oude en nieuwe batons

- The Bronze Star: despite its name, the Bronze Star was actually made in silver; the obverse disc featured a silver Coat of arms of the Netherlands on a blue enamel background. The reverse disc was the same as the Great Silver Star.

The ribbon was originally blue with an orange central stripe, the same as the "Brother" grade of the Order of the Netherlands Lion; for the Great and Small Gold Stars the ribbon had an additional narrow orange stripe on the edges. These were changed on 1 April 1945 into a blue ribbon with one to five narrow orange wavy stripes, with five stripes being the highest (Great Gold Star).

== Sources ==
- "Rondschrijven van de 1e Gouvernements Secretaris dd. 10 Augustus 1929, No. 1841/AI, betreffende de uitreiking van onderscheidingen", gepubliceerd in het Indisch Staatsblad No. 12083
- "Besluit van 4 Januari 1924 no. 19, betreffende de onderscheiding van het bestaande eereteeken voor aanzienlijke en verdienstelijke Inlanders en Oostersche vreemdelingen in vijf klassen", gepubliceerd in het Indisch Staatsblad No. 10507
- "Circulaire van de Gouvernements Secretaris dd. 27 Augustus 1909, No. 2240, betreffende de toekenning van de zilveren ster voor trouw en verdienste aan desahoofden", gepubliceerd in het Indisch Staatsblad No. 7083
- "EERETEEKENEN voor aanzienlijke en verdienstelijke Inlanders en Oostersche vreemdelingen. De hoogere onderscheiding vervangt de lagere.", gepubliceerd in het Indisch Staatsblad No. 6201
- "Besluit Eereteekenen. Vorm der eereteekenen voor aanzienlijke en verdienstelijke Inlanders en Oostersche vreemdelingen", gepubliceerd in het Indisch Staatsblad No. 4961
- "Moed en Deugd" door J.A.van Zelm van Eldik, 2003
- "Orders and Decorations of The Netherlands", door H.G. Meijer, C.P. Mulder en B.W. Wagenaar, 1984
- "Ster voor Trouw en Verdienste, 1893", door R.J.M. Verkuijlen in het tijdschrift Decorare, nummer 5, September 2001

== See also ==
- Cross for Courage and Fidelity
