= De Ruyter Medal =

- Type: Civil decoration, with degrees gold, silver and bronze
- Awarded for: praiseworthy acts of duty for Dutch shipping
- Description: circular medal with a picture of Michiel de Ruyter on the obverse. The medal is worn with a dark orange ribbon.
- Presented by: Kingdom of the Netherlands
- Eligibility: seamen, shipowners, and for rescues at sea
- Status: Currently awarded
- Established: 23 March 1907
- First award: Skipper P.J.A. Kramer (1907)
- Final award: Captain Yevhenii Feshchenko, captain of the Hanze Goteborg (2023)^{1}

Highlights
- Total: 209 (93 gold, 88 silver, 28 bronze)
- Ribbon bar of the golden De Ruyter Medal

Precedence
- Next (higher): KNMI Medal
- Next (lower): Museum Medal

De Ruyter Medal (Dutch: De Ruyter-medaille) was created by royal decree no. 1 on 23 March 1907 by Queen Wilhelmina of the Netherlands, on the three hundredth birthday of Admiral Michiel de Ruyter.

The medal is awarded to those members of the Dutch Merchant fleet who distinguish themselves by praiseworthy acts of duty for Dutch shipping. The medal was originally awarded in gold, silver or bronze, with only gold medals awarded since 1969. Awards are on basis by nomination of the Netherlands government and by royal decree.

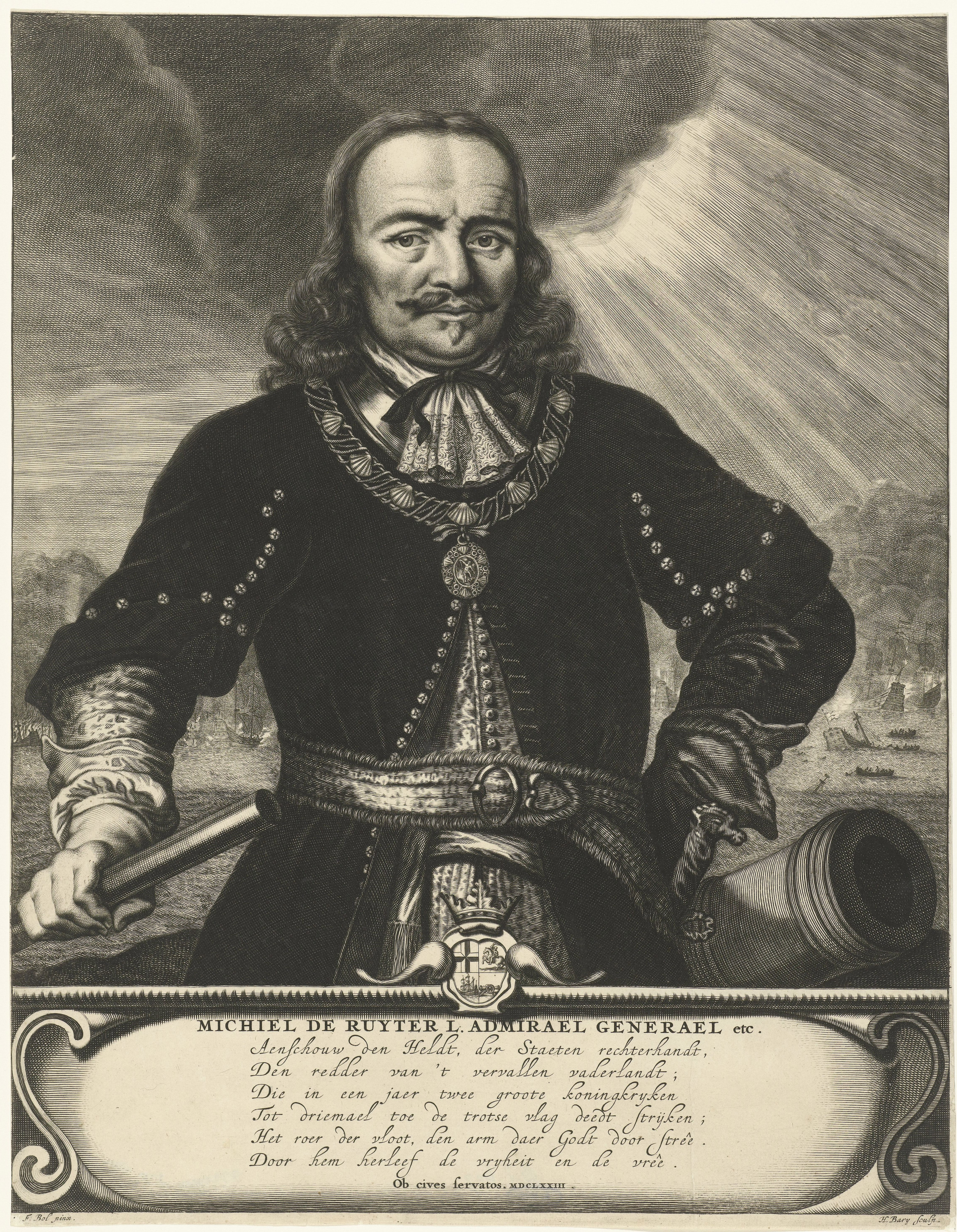
Michiel de Ruyter

== Sources ==
- J.A. van Zelm van Eldik, "Moed en Deugd", Zutphen 2003
- F.P. de Boer, "Honderd jaar De Ruytermedaille 1907–2007", 2007
- H.G. Meijer, C.P. Mulder en B.W. Wagenaar, "Orders and Decorations of The Netherlands", 1984
- C.H. Evers, "Onderscheidingen - Leidraad voor de decoraties van het Koninkrijk der Nederlanden", 2001
- C.P. Mulder, "Tot belooning van edele menschenvrienden", Z.J.
- W. Uilkens, "Gedenkboek NZHRM 1824–1924", 1924

^{1} https://www.rijksoverheid.nl/documenten/toespraken/2023/10/25/uitreiking-van-de-ruytermedaille-rijnstraat-25-oktober-2023
