= Androcles and the Lion =

Folktale

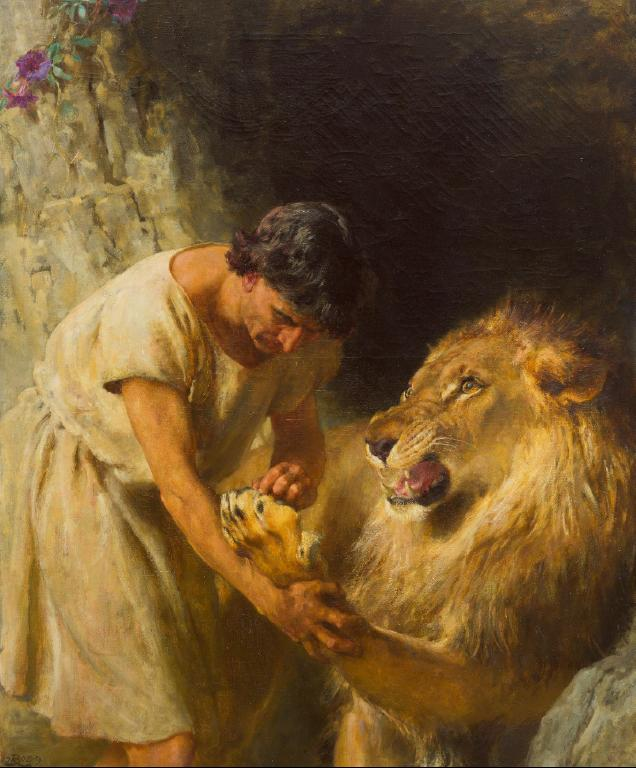
- The slave Androcles plucks the thorn from the lion's paw.

Folk tale
- Name: Androcles and the Lion
- Aarne–Thompson grouping: ATU 156
- Region: Greece, Rome, Europe

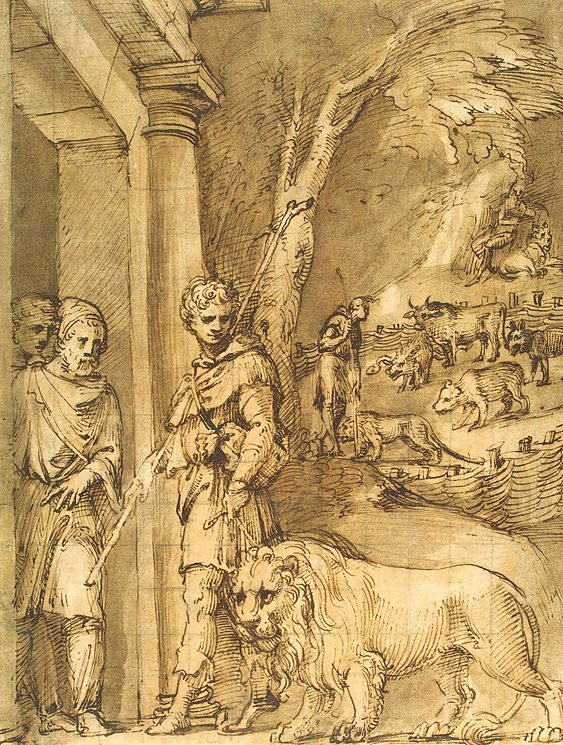
We used to see Androcles with the lion attached to a slender leash, making the rounds of the city, a pen and wash drawing by Baldassare Peruzzi, 1530s

Androcles (Greek: Ἀνδροκλῆς, alternatively spelled Androclus in Latin) and the Lion is a folk tale about a man befriending a lion.

The tale is included in the Aarne–Thompson classification system as type 156. The story reappeared in the Middle Ages as "The Shepherd and the Lion" and was then ascribed to Aesop's Fables. It is numbered 563 in the Perry Index and can be compared to Aesop's The Lion and the Mouse in both its general trend and in its moral of the reciprocal nature of mercy.

== Classical tale ==
The earliest surviving account of the Androcles episode is found in Aulus Gellius's 2nd-century Attic Nights. The author relates there a story told by Apion in his lost work Aegyptiaca/Αἰγυπτιακά (Wonders of Egypt), the events of which Apion claimed to have personally witnessed in Rome. In this version, Androclus (going by the Latin variation of the name) is a runaway slave of a former Roman consul administering a part of Rome. He takes shelter in a cave, which turns out to be the den of a wounded lion, from whose paw he removes a large thorn. In gratitude, the lion becomes tame towards him and henceforward shares his catch with the slave.

After three years, Androclus craves a return to civilization but is soon imprisoned as a fugitive slave and sent to Rome. There, he is condemned to be devoured by wild animals in the Circus Maximus in the presence of an emperor who is named in the account as Gaius Caesar, presumably Caligula. The most imposing of the beasts turns out to be the same lion, which again displays its affection toward Androclus. After questioning him, the emperor pardons the slave in recognition of this testimony to the power of friendship, and he is left in possession of the lion. Apion, who claimed to have been a spectator on this occasion, is then quoted as relating:

Afterwards we used to see Androclus with the lion attached to a slender leash, making the rounds of the tabernae throughout the city; Androclus was given money, the lion was sprinkled with flowers, and everyone who met them anywhere exclaimed, "This is the lion, a man's friend; this is the man, a lion's doctor".

The story was repeated a century later by Claudius Aelianus in his work On the Nature of Animals.

However, an alternative version of the start of the story was related by Thomas Keightley in the introduction to his book on Classical mythology. In explanation of the origin of a temple to "The Gaping Dionysos" on the island of Samos, a story was told by Pliny the Elder of its foundation by a Samian named Elpis, who encountered a gaping lion on the African seashore and freed it of a bone in its teeth that was preventing its feeding. Thereafter the lion shared a portion of its prey with Elpis until his departure.

== Later use ==
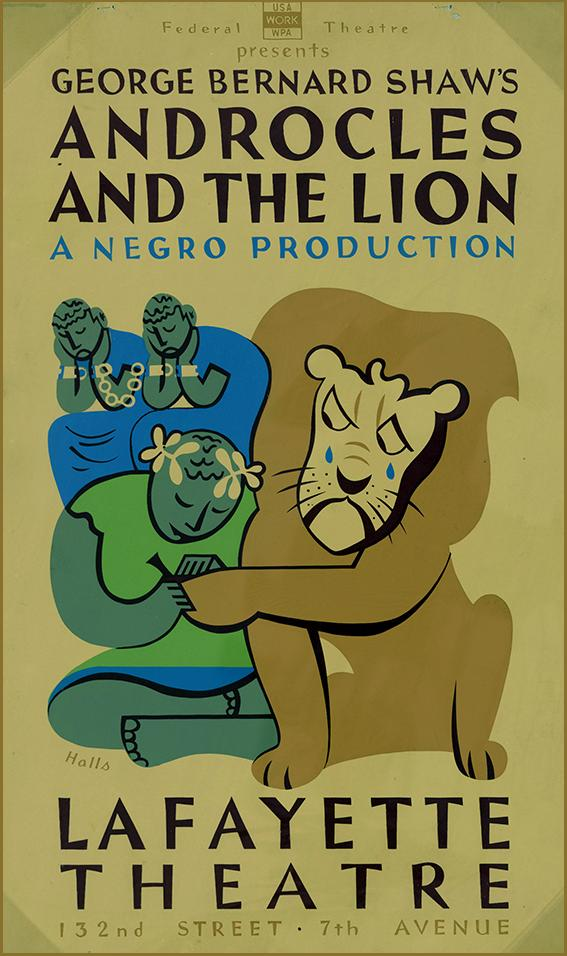
Poster for the Federal Theatre Project production of Shaw's Androcles and the Lion (1938)

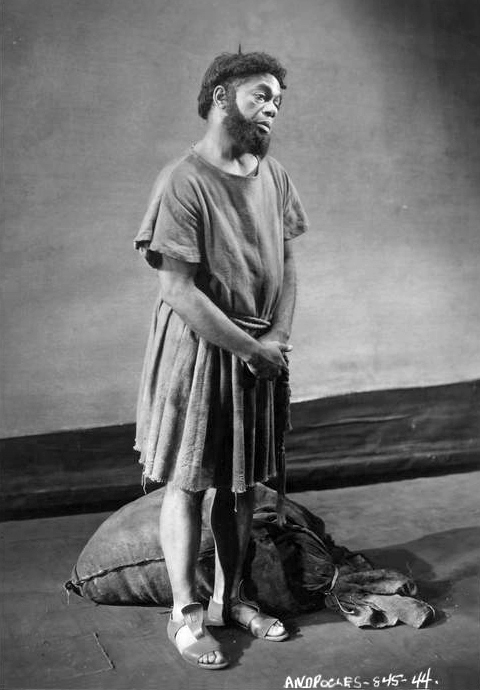
Dooley Wilson as Androcles in the Federal Theatre Project production of Androcles and the Lion (1938)

Later versions of the story, sometimes attributed to Aesop, began to appear from the mid-sixth century under the title "The Shepherd and the Lion". In Chrétien de Troyes' 12th-century romance "Yvain, the Knight of the Lion", the knightly main character helps a lion that is attacked by a serpent. The lion then becomes his companion and helps him during his adventures. A century later, the story of taking a thorn from a lion's paw was related as an act of Saint Jerome in the Golden Legend of Jacobus de Voragine (c. 1260). Afterwards the lion joins him in the monastery, and a different set of stories follows.

The later retelling, "Of the Remembrance of Benefits", in the Gesta Romanorum (Deeds of the Romans) of about 1330 in England, has a mediaeval setting and again makes the protagonist a knight. In the earliest English printed collection of Aesop's Fables by William Caxton, the tale appears as The lyon & the pastour or herdman and reverts to the story of a shepherd who cares for the wounded lion. He is later convicted of a crime and taken to Rome to be thrown to the wild beasts, only to be recognised and defended from the other animals by the one that he tended.

A Latin poem by Vincent Bourne dating from 1716–17 is based on the account of Aulus Gellius. Titled Mutua Benevolentia primaria lex naturae est, it was translated by William Cowper as "Reciprocal kindness: the primary law of nature".

George Bernard Shaw's play Androcles and the Lion (1912) makes Androcles a tailor; he is also given Christian beliefs for the purposes of the play, which on the whole takes a sceptical view of religion. The first film adaptation of the story in the US was also made in 1912. Afterwards there were several others for both cinema and TV. Rob Englehart's The Lion, the Slave and the Rodent (2010) was a much later American approach to the fable. A one-act chamber opera for five voices, it combined the story of Androcles with the fable of "The Lion and the Mouse".

== Artistic depictions ==
=== Prints and paintings ===
Renaissance prints of the story are based on the Classical accounts. Agostino Veneziano depicts the slave Androcles being freed by the emperor in a work from 1516–17 now in the LACMA collection. There is also an early pen and wash drawing by Baldassare Peruzzi dating from the 1530s in the Hermitage Museum. Dependent on the account by Aulus Gellius, it depicts Androcles walking through a doorway with the lion on a lead at his heel. Other artists have preferred the scene of Androcles pulling the thorn from the lion's paw, as in Bernhard Rode's print of 1784. A later American example is Walter Inglis Anderson's block print scroll of 1950, which was based on his 1935 painting.

Paintings of the subject began in the 18th century. That by Charles Meynier, which was exhibited at the Paris Salon of 1795, is now lost. However, a study for the painting has recently been discovered and shows Androcles as a nearly naked warrior brandishing his sword in the stadium while the lion lies on the ground and is – following the account of Aulus Gellius – "gently licking his feet". There are also studies for an unachieved painting by American artist Henry Ossawa Tanner dating from his student years in 1885-86. They include a lion licking its paw and a kneeling and grey-bearded Androcles. At mid-century in 1856 comes "Androcles and the Lion" by the English artist Alexander Davis Cooper (1820–95). There a young man in Arab dress looks towards the viewer as he walks across a desert landscape with his hand in the lion's mane.

In the 20th century, Jean-Léon Gérôme depicted Androcles in a painting tentatively dated 1902 and now in the Museo Nacional de Bellas Artes (Buenos Aires). There Androcles is sitting cross-legged on the floor of the cave as he draws the thorn from the lion's paw while it roars in agony. Briton Riviere's 1908 painting of him standing to perform the same task is in the Auckland Art Gallery. Another approach was to show the earlier incident of Androcles surprised in the cave by the lion's entrance. This was the subject chosen by Vassily Rotschev (d.1803) soon after returning to Russia from training in Rome. It was also the choice of the Chinese painter Xu Beihong. His "Slave and Lion" dates from a stay in Berlin during the early 1920s and shows the lion entering the mouth of a cave while Androcles cowers against the wall.

=== Sculptures ===
Androcles also became a sculptural subject. Jan Pieter van Baurscheit the Elder's sandstone statue, executed between 1700 and 1725, is now at the Rijksmuseum in Amsterdam and shows a triumphant figure bestriding a very small lion that rears up to look at him. Its frisky behaviour brings to mind Aulus Gellius' description of the lion "wagging his tail in a mild and caressing way, after the manner and fashion of fawning dogs". In 1751 the English monumental sculptor Henry Cheere created two white marble chimneypieces showing the slave bending over the lion's paw to draw out the thorn. One is in the Saloon at West Wycombe Park, and the other is now in the Lady Lever Art Gallery. A continental example by Jean-Baptiste Stouf was sculpted in 1789 and is now only known through the modern bronze reproduction at the Ashmolean Museum. Formerly it was in the Louvre and showed Androcles tending the lion's paw.

In the 19th century Androcles became a subject for French table ornaments. One from 1820 shows him sword in hand in the arena as the lion crouches at his feet, while another from 1825 has him tending the injured paw. About 1898, Jean-Léon Gérôme, who was soon to paint that scene too, produced a sculpture of Androcles leading the lion about on his tour of the Roman taverns. Titled Le Mendiant (the beggar), it is made of bronze gilt and shows the former slave standing with one hand on the lion's mane and a begging bowl at his feet. On its stand is the inscription Date obolum Androcli (spare a penny for Androclus). In the 20th century the American sculptor Frederick Charles Shrady incorporated the theme of removing the thorn from the paw into a modernistic design.

=== Medals ===
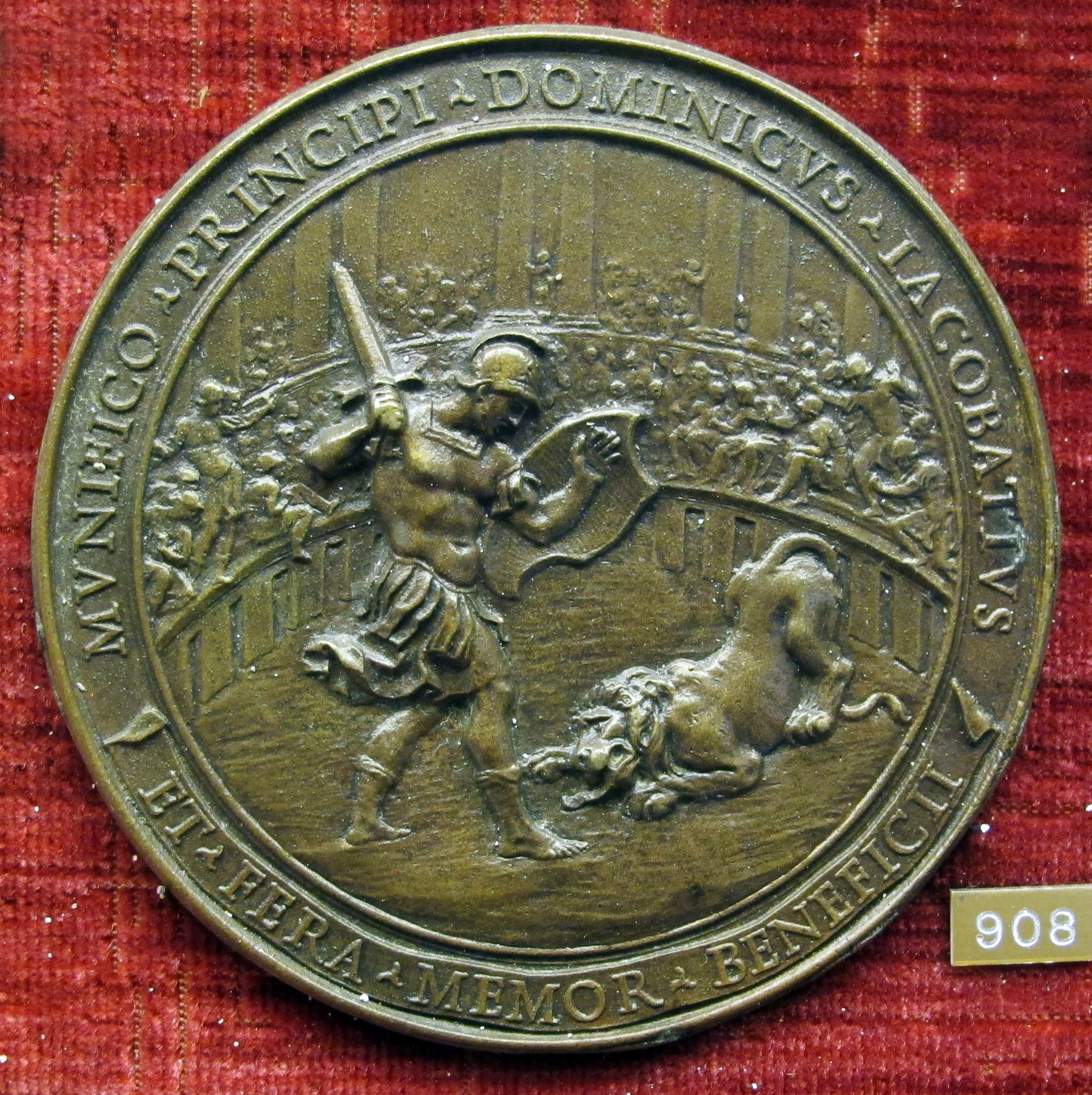
Gioacchino Francesco Travani's medal in honour of Pope Alexander VII

The legend has figured on medals for various reasons over the course of four centuries. One attributed to Gioacchino Francesco Travani, using a design by Gian Lorenzo Bernini, was struck in 1659. It depicts on one side a relief bust of Pope Alexander VII surrounded by an acanthus leaf border. On the reverse a lion prostrates itself at the feet of an armed Androcles. The complimentary Latin inscription reads 'Domenico Jacobacci to the generous prince: Even a wild animal remembers a favor'. Jacobacci was the donor of the medal, which commemorates a pope who had been generous in rebuilding parts of Rome. The lion represents the grateful city paying homage at the feet of the 'warrior' on its behalf.

The image of the grateful beast was a natural choice for the medals awarded in yearly recognition of prize-winners at the Royal Dick Veterinary College in Edinburgh. Struck in copper and silver during the 1890s, they picture Androcles kneeling to relieve the suffering lion. In the background are a cliff on the left and palm trees on the right; Androcles is depicted with African features. A more schematic representation now forms the logo of the Faculty of Veterinary Medicine at Utrecht University.

In the 20th century, the Dutch Medal of Recognition 1940–1945 also pictured the scene of relieving the lion and was awarded to those who aided the Dutch during the period of World War II, or afterwards helped those who had suffered from the German occupation. The subject was chosen because a lion was the national symbol. The theme of gratitude is reinforced by the inscription about the edge: Sibi benefacit qui benefacit amico (He benefits himself who benefits a friend).
