= Decoration for Order and Peace =

Decoration for Order and Peace Ereteken voor Orde en Vrede
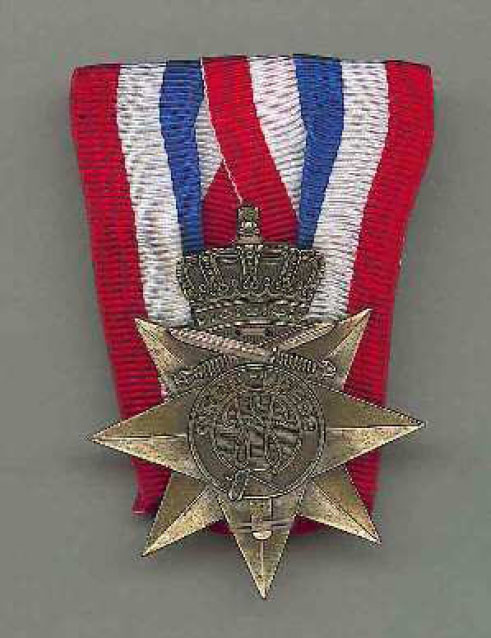
- Obverse of the Medal for Order and Peace
- Type: Military campaign decoration
- Presented by: the Kingdom of the Netherlands
- Status: No longer awarded
- Established: 12 December 1947
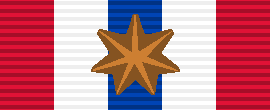
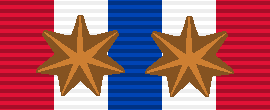
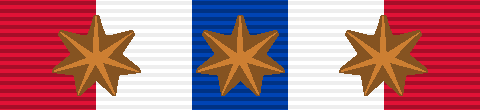
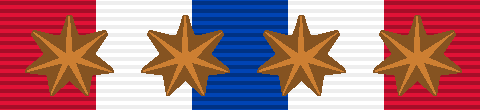
- Undress ribbon of the medal Undress Ribbon for one clasp Undress Ribbon for two clasps Undress Ribbon for three clasps Undress Ribbon for four clasps

Precedence
- Next (higher): Resistance Commemorative Cross
- Next (lower): New Guinea Commemorative Cross

The Decoration for Order and Peace (Dutch: Ereteken voor Orde en Vrede) is a military award of the Netherlands. The medal was established on 12 December 1947 by royal decree of Queen Wilhelmina. The medal commemorates at least three months of service in the Dutch East Indies and adjacent waters during the Indonesian National Revolution. It was awarded to members of the Netherlands Armed Forces and the Royal Netherlands East Indies Army. Recipients who were engaged with hostile parties in a military context could be awarded clasps indicating the year of the action.

== Criteria ==
The Decoration for Order and Peace was awarded to members of the Netherlands Armed Forces units and the Royal Netherlands East Indies Army. To qualify, service must have been in the Dutch East Indies or the adjacent sea areas for at least three months between 3 September 1945 and 4 June 1951.

Originally, the recognized period of eligible service was through 27 December 1949, the date of the transfer of sovereignty to the new Republic of Indonesia. The criteria was changed retrospectively and extended to 4 June 1951. This extension covered the period of transfer of administrative and police functions to the Republic of Indonesia. It also covered the period when of evacuation of Dutch nationals who wanted to leave the new republic.

The decoration is not awarded for service after 27 September 1949 in Dutch New Guinea and its adjacent sea areas, or in Indonesia as members of the Dutch Military Mission. Service in Dutch New Guinea was recognized by the New Guinea Commemorative Cross.

== Appearance ==
The medal is a bronze eight pointed star, 40 mm (1.6 in) where the top most point has been replaced by a royal crown. The obverse of the star bears a central round medallion, 18 mm (0.71 in) wide with a stylized letter W in the middle. Above this letter are the words Orde - Vrede (Order - Peace). Surmounting the medallion are two crossed swords. The radius of the star is 20 millimeters. The medal is suspended form a silk ribbon 27 mm (1.1 in) wide, consisting of five equal stripes from left to right in the colors red; white, blue, white, red.

== Clasps ==
For those individuals who actually participated in military action against hostile forces, a clasp was awarded for wear on the medal. Clasps were worn on the medal in year order with the first clasp being worn closest to the medal. Individuals who qualified for the clasp did not have to meet the three months of service requirement. The following clasps were awarded:

- 1945
- 1946
- 1947
- 1948
- 1949
- 1950
- 1951
