= Honorary Sabre =

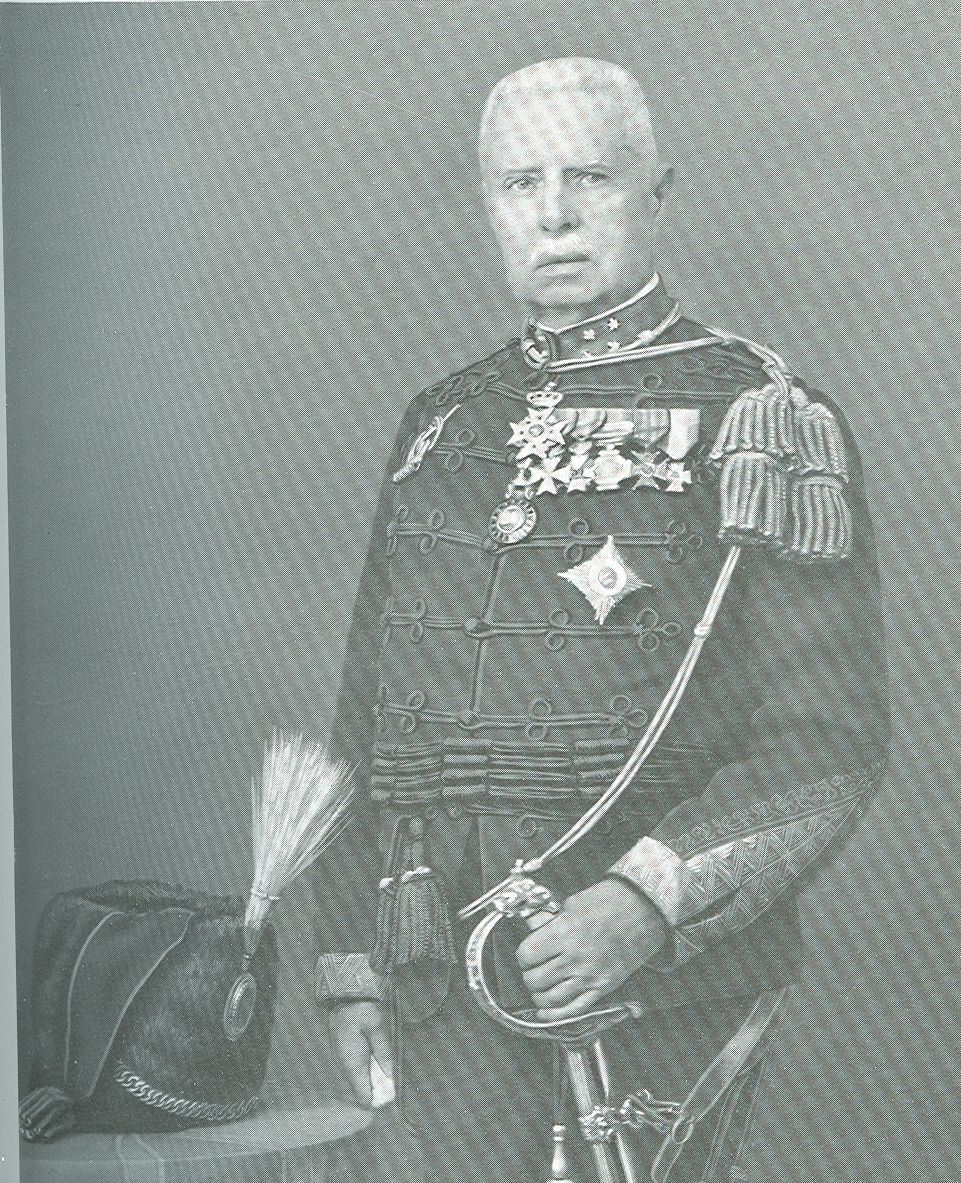
- Lieutenant General Willem Boetje with an Honorary Sabre.
- Type: Military award, attached to the MWO
- Awarded for: Exceptional display of bravery
- Presented by: Kingdom of the Netherlands
- Eligibility: Only for MWO-knights
- Status: Not currently awarded
- Established: Unknown
- First award: Probably since the Dutch Republic
- Final award: Dwight D. Eisenhower

Highlights
- Total: 106
- Ribbon bar of the Honorary Sabre

Precedence
- Next (higher): Cross for Courage and Fidelity
- Next (lower): Dutch Cross of Resistance

The Honorary Sabre is one of the highest military awards for bravery in the Kingdom of the Netherlands. Only knights of the Military William Order are eligible to receive this sabre. The King awards this highly decorated sabre to a military officer who will wear this together with his uniform.

== History of the Honorary Sabre ==
The Netherlands had honorary sabres of equivalent for centuries. During the Dutch Republic, the Batavian Republic and the Kingdom of Holland such sabres already existed, and were awarded by grateful subordinates to their officer, or were awarded by a government, city, or ruler to a military officer.

Sabres awarded by military officers and soldiers to their commanders during the Ten days campaign didn't have an official status yet.

The honorary sabres made in 1855 were destined primarily for officers of the Royal Dutch East Indies Army who already were knighted in the Military William Order and again showed deeds of exceptional bravery.

After the royal decree in 1865 Honorary Sabres were also awarded to officers of the Royal Netherlands Army and the Schutterij.

An honorary sabre was always a decorated workmanship of the weapon and its hilt;the scabbard and blade were decorated and engraved, and the material of the sword was gold and silver, or during more difficult times made of cheaper nickel silver, horn and gold-plated copper.

== Shape of the Honorary Sabre ==
During the history several types of the sabre existed:

- The 1st Dutch East Indies model of 1855:

At the hilt is engraved "KONINKLIJK EEREBLIJK VOOR BETOONDE DAPPERHEID" (English: Royal Honorary Token for Displayed Bravery)

- The 1st Royal Netherlands Navy Model of 1859:

The inscription of this sabre was the same as the one of 1855, however the shape is the same used by the Royal Netherlands Navy since 1843. At the blade also a crowned anchor is shown without a cable.

- The 2nd Dutch East Indies model of 1861:

On the hilt is engraved "KONING WILLEM III VOOR BETOONDE DAPPERHEID" (English: King William III for Displayed Bravery), and on the blade the name and ranking of the awarded officer and cause for awarding the sabre

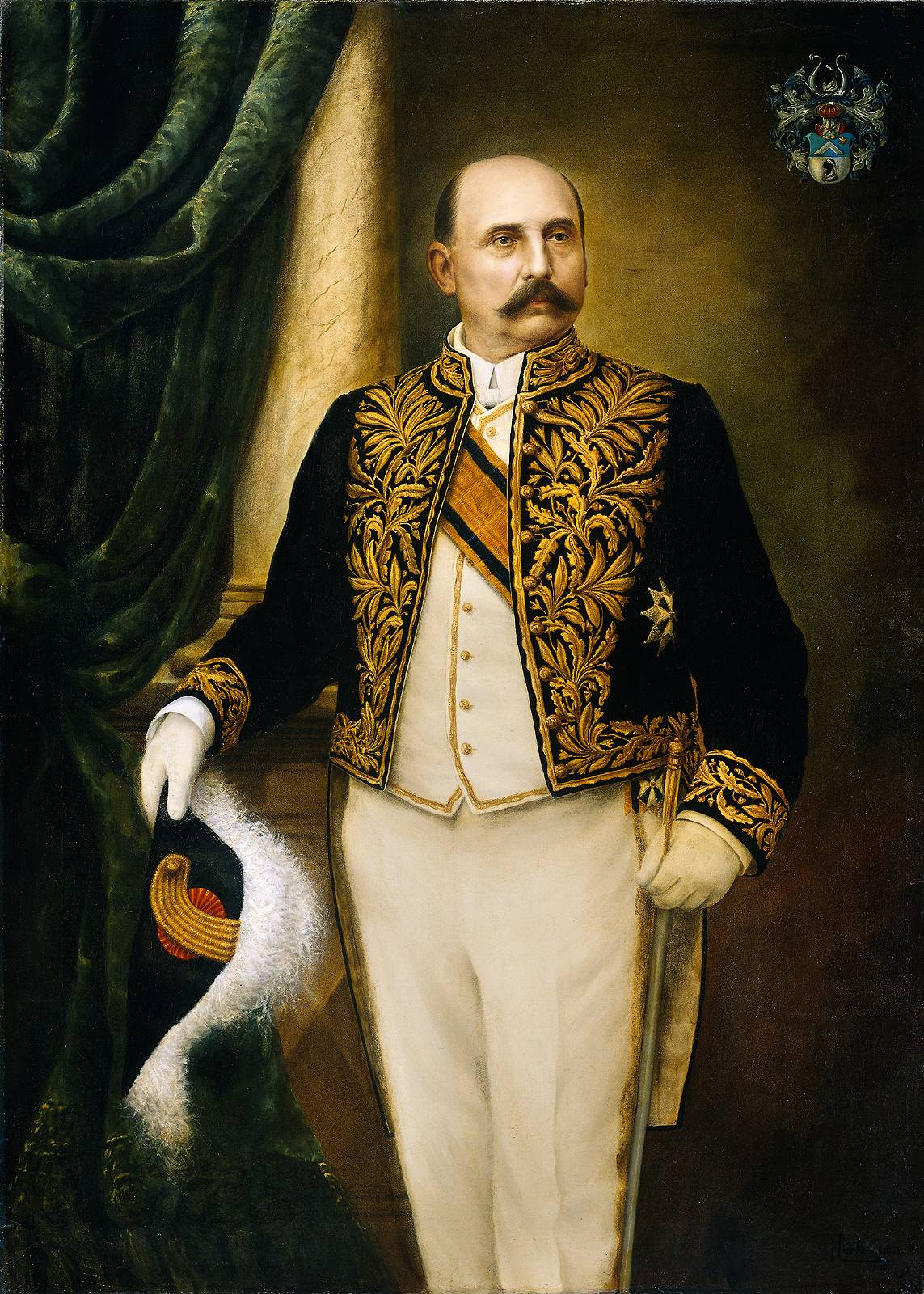
Governor-General J. B. van Heutsz wearing his Honorary Sabre

- The 2nd Royal Netherlands Navy Model of 1864:

The hilt was made of ivory and the anchor displayed at the blade is now uncrowned.

- The model for the Royal Netherlands Army and the Schutterij of 1867
- The 3rd Dutch East Indies model of 1891:

On the hilt is engraved "NAMENS KONINGIN WILHELMINA VOOR BETOONDE DAPPERHEID" (English: on behalf of Queen Wilhelmina for Displayed Bravery)

- The 4th Dutch East Indies model of 1895:

This sabre was very highly decorated (English: Queen Wilhelmina for Displayed Bravery)

- The 3rd Royal Netherlands Navy Model of 1907
- The Honorary Sabre of General Eisenhower in 1947:

General Dwight D. Eisenhower received an Honorary Sabre in 1947 from the Netherlands government. This sabre is orientally shaped, and made of gold and silver, together with embedded gemstones. Engraved on the sabre is "Queen Wilhelmina to General DD Eisenhower" and "Grateful memory of the glorious liberation". The Coat of arms of the Netherlands was engraved into the pommel.

The Dutch kings or queens awarded in total 106 Honorary Sabres in the Dutch East Indies. The last sabre awarded to a Dutch officer was in 1927 to Infantry Captain H. Behrens. General Eisenhower was the last person to be awarded with this honour.
