= Decoration of Merit =

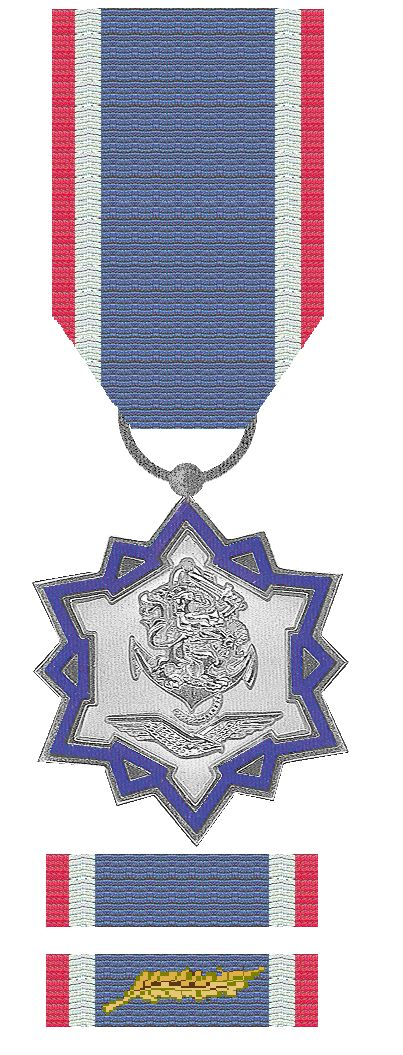
- The silver Decoration of Merit with ribbon bars
- Type: Military decoration, with degrees in gold, silver and bronze
- Awarded for: See text
- Country: Netherlands
- Presented by: the Ministry of Defence
- Status: Currently awarded
- Established: 16 April 1987

Precedence
- Next (higher): Medal of Recognition
- Next (lower): Cross for Important War Actions

The Decoration of Merit is an important military decoration for bravery in the Netherlands. The medal was established by the Dutch minister of defence, Wim van Eekelen, on 16 April 1987. The award was created by ministerial decree and is therefore a medal of the Netherlands Ministry of Defence and not a royal decoration.

Defence ministries in Germany and the Czech Republic award similar decorations. This way chivalric orders keep their exclusivity.

The 1987 ministerial decree stated four criteria for granting in silver or gold:

- exceptional merits towards the armed forces which are incidentally of nature,
- individual courage in life-threatening situations,
- brave action in conflict situations in peace time, and
- particular merits of Dutch and foreign civil and military authorities.

In 2002, minister Benk Korthals added a fifth criteria for granting the medal "exceptional activities for the Netherlands Armed forces". An amendment by defence minister Jeanine Hennis-Plasschaert in 2017 introduced a bronze grade. A clarification was made that the gold order is intended to be awarded for exceptional service to the entire armed forces, the silver for exceptional service to multiple branches and the bronze for service to a single branch.

The medal is the sixth highest military decoration, after the Medal of Recognition, still being awarded for bravery.

== Design ==
The medal has the shape of an old Dutch fortresses in the style that was introduced in the late 17th century by the Dutch fortress builder Menno van Coehoorn. The moat of the hexagonal fortresses has been reflected in blue enamel. In the middle of the depicted fortresses the symbols of three of the four branches of the Netherlands armed forces are displayed. These are the "climbing lion with sword and arrows" of the Royal Netherlands Army, the "anchor" of the Royal Netherlands Navy, and the "flying eagle" of the Royal Netherlands Air Force. The "burning grenade", the symbol of the fourth branch, the Royal Marechaussee, is absent. On the reverse side, the words KONINKRIJK DER NEDERLANDEN (English: Kingdom of the Netherlands) and MINISTER VAN DEFENSIE (English: Minister of Defence) are engraved in a circle.

The medal is worn with a Nassau blue ribbon that has narrow red and white borders. Recipients may wear a ribbon bar on their uniform with the same composition (although on the ribbon bar of the golden medal has a golden palm branch added to it).

== American sergeant posthumously awarded ==
On 12 September 2007 American sergeant Alexander van Aalten, (a descendant of Dutch ancestors) posthumously received the Decoration of Merit in gold. On 20 April 2007 Van Aalten, while in Afghanistan, volunteered to assist in the recovery of the body of a fallen Dutch Corporal Strik who had been killed by an improvised explosive device. Van Aalten was however himself killed by a land mine while attempting to retrieve the body of Strik. The golden Decoration of Merit was presented by Netherlands Minister of Defence Eimert van Middelkoop to the widow Shana van Aalten. The family of sergeant Van Aalten chose to have their son buried at Arlington National Cemetery. The presentation was at Arlington.

Van Aalten was a member of the 1st Battalion, 508th Infantry Regiment, 82nd Airborne Division, an American airborne infantry division. The 82nd Airborne played a large role in the liberation of the Netherlands during the Second World War. During the Battle of Arnhem this division suffered heavy losses. Queen Wilhelmina of the Netherlands authorized the attachment of the cross of Military William Order to the standard of the regiment for the liberation of Nijmegen.
