= Cross for Courage and Fidelity =

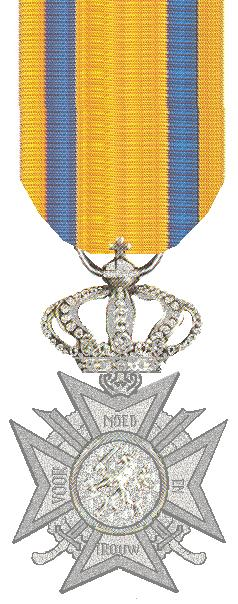
- The cross for Courage and Fidelity.
- Type: Military award, silver and bronze
- Awarded for: Exceptional display of bravery and fidelity by a native in the Netherlands East Indies
- Presented by: Kingdom of the Netherlands
- Status: Still living recipients, but no longer awarded
- Established: 7 March 1898
- Final award: 2 November 1927

Highlights
- Total: 275 (13 silver and 262 bronze)
- Ribbon bar of the Cross

Precedence
- Next (higher): Military William Order
- Next (lower): Honorary Sabre

The Cross for Courage and Fidelity (Dutch: Kruis voor Moed en Trouw) is a military award that was established by Queen Emma of the Netherlands by Royal Decree on 7 March 1898. The cross replaced the old Medal for Courage and Fidelity, which had limited prestige and status according to the Netherlands government. The cross is the second highest award of the Kingdom of the Netherlands, preceded only by the Military William Order. The cross was awarded to (and is still worn by) natives of the Netherlands East Indies that showed exceptional display of bravery and fidelity.

The cross has a resemblance to the Military William Order and is worn with the same ribbon as that order. The shape of the cross itself is somewhat different in the sense that the cross and crown are made of non-enamelled silver. On the cross of the Military William Order a gold spark rod is shown in the middle. However, on the cross for Courage and Fidelity, a heraldic Dutch Lion is shown. Between the arms of this cross two klewangs are added. The text on the cross has the description "VOOR MOED EN TROUW" (English: for Courage and Fidelity) and at the back "Daden van Moed en Trouw in Nederlands-Indië door inlanders betoond" (English: Deeds of Courage and Fidelity in the Netherlands East Indies by natives awarded). Between the crown and cross is a spark rod, a distinguishing mark of the Order of the Golden Fleece or the Military William Order.

The Governor-General of the Netherlands East Indies was authorized to award the cross. A total of 262 bronze and 13 silver crosses have been awarded, most of them in 1925. The last cross was awarded in 1927; after that natives and native soldiers of the Royal Dutch East Indies Army were also eligible to receive the Military William Order.

Those recipients who lost the cross during the Japanese occupation of the Dutch East Indies could receive a new cross but without an emblazoned crown.

== Criticism ==
The cross, nicknamed the "Military William Order for natives", has been regarded by many as discriminatory to the natives in the Netherlands East Indies.

== See also ==
- Star for Loyalty and Merit
