= Civil awards and decorations =

Decoration awarded for services of a non-military nature

Civil awards and decorations are awarded to civilians for distinguished service or for eminence in a field of endeavour. Military personnel might also be eligible for services of a non-military nature. There are various forms of civil awards and decorations, including the following.

- Orders of chivalry, usually in several classes, for distinguished service to the government, the community, society or humanity. One example that is non-military in nature would be the British Order of St Michael and St George. Other orders may contain both military and civil divisions, such as the Order of the British Empire.
- State orders that are not orders of chivalry, for service to the government, the community, society or humanity. An example would be the Order of Canada, or certain Orders of the Russian Federation.
- Awards and decorations for service to the government or for eminence in a field of endeavour. Examples are the American Congressional Gold Medal, the Presidential Medal of Freedom, and the President's Award for Distinguished Federal Civilian Service.
- Awards and decorations for bravery of civilians (including law enforcement and firefighting personnel). Examples would be the British George Cross, and the American Lifesaving Medal.
- Awards and decorations for distinguished service in law enforcement, firefighting and other services.
- Awards and decorations for long service in government, law enforcement, firefighting and other services.
- Awards and decorations that are international in nature, such as the United Nations Public Service Awards, the Nobel Prize, and Olympic medals.
- Awards and decorations for women, such as the Order of Maternal Glory and the Cross of Honour of the German Mother.
- Service in the Merchant Navy, such as the British Merchant Navy Medal for Meritorious Service.

On everyday occasions, only miniature insignia, often in the form of a circular rosette, are normally worn.

== See also ==
- List of civil awards and decorations
- Military awards and decorations
- Order (distinction)
- State decoration
