= List of members of the House of Representatives of the Netherlands for the Farmer–Citizen Movement =

This is a list of members of the House of Representatives of the Netherlands for Farmer–Citizen Movement (Dutch: BoerBurgerBeweging, BBB).

== List ==
| Name | Start of term | End of term | Ref. |
|---|---|---|---|
| Derk Jan Eppink | 1 September 2023 (Note: Was previously member of the House of Representatives for the JA21.) | 5 December 2023 | |
| Lilian Helder | 1 September 2023 (Note: Was previously member of the House of Representatives for the Party for Freedom.) | 4 March 2025 | |
| Agnes Joseph | 30 July 2025 (Note: Was previously member of the House of Representatives for New Social Contract.) | 11 November 2025 | |
| Mona Keijzer | 6 December 2023 | 2 July 2024 | |
| Mona Keijzer | 12 November 2025 | 22 February 2026 | |
| Martin Oostenbrink | 5 March 2025 | 11 November 2025 | |
| Cor Pierik | 6 December 2023 | 11 November 2025 | |
| Caroline van der Plas | 31 March 2021 | | |
| Nicki Pouw-Verweij | 1 September 2023 | 5 December 2023 | |
| Mariska Rikkers | 4 July 2024 | 11 November 2025 | |
| Gijs Tuinman | 6 December 2023 | 2 July 2024 | |
| Henk Vermeer | 6 December 2023 | | |
| Marieke Wijen-Nass | 4 July 2024 | 11 November 2025 | |
| Femke Wiersma | 12 November 2025 | | |
| Claudia van Zanten | 6 December 2023 | 11 November 2025 | |
