= Kenneth Mayhew =

British World War II veteran (1917–2021)

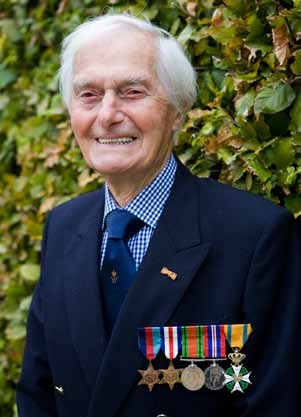
- Mayhew in 2011.
- Born: 18 January 1917; Helmingham, Suffolk, England
- Died: 13 May 2021 (aged 104)
- Military career
- Allegiance: United Kingdom
- Branch: British Army
- Service years: 1939–45
- Rank: Major
- Unit: Suffolk Regiment
- Conflicts: Second World War: North West Europe Campaign; D-Day (Sword Beach); Operation Charnwood; Operation Market Garden; Battle of Overloon
- Awards: Knight 4th Class of the Military William Order (Netherlands)

Major Kenneth George Mayhew (18 January 1917 – 13 May 2021) was a British Army veteran of the Second World War. Mayhew was one of the recipients of the Military William Order, the highest honour of the Kingdom of the Netherlands.

In 1939 Kenneth Mayhew volunteered to join the Suffolk Regiment and served as an officer of the 1st Battalion of the Suffolk Regiment. He commanded a company which landed in Normandy in 1944 and fought in the North West Europe Campaign. Mayhew was injured while fighting in the Netherlands. He resumed command of his company before being injured again and returning to the United Kingdom.

In 1946 Mayhew was knighted by Queen Wilhelmina of the Netherlands, receiving the Knight fourth class of the Military William Order. The chapter of the order lost contact with him in the 1980s until he was seen wearing his medal at a memorial service in 2011. He subsequently became an active member of the order.

== Early life ==
Mayhew was born in Suffolk on 18 January 1917, as the son of a farmer. He attended Framlingham College. From 1936 to 1939 he played cricket for the Suffolk County Cricket Club.

== Military service ==
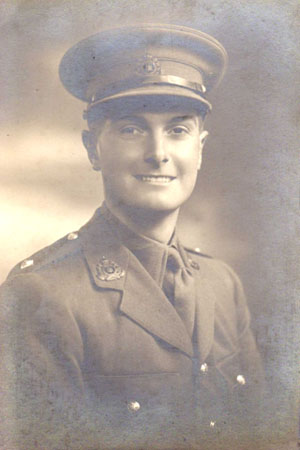
Second Lieutenant Mayhew, 1940–41

At the outbreak of the Second World War in 1939 Mayhew was conscripted. In January 1940, he entered the Royal Military College, Sandhurst, and following completion of his training became a second lieutenant in the 1st Battalion of the Suffolk Regiment, 8th Infantry Brigade, 3rd Infantry Division. Originally scheduled to cross to Southern France in 1940 before the Fall of France, the battalion stayed in the United Kingdom, and from 1942 they began preparing for an invasion of France and simulating landings.

On 6 June 1944 Mayhew commanded a company equipped with 13 armoured infantry carriers that landed at Sword Beach in Normandy, on D-Day. His unit captured the Hillman Battery, a 12-bunker complex defended by 150 men of the 736 Infantry Regiment, as part of the liberation of Colleville-sur-Orne. They then fought during the Battle for Caen, and on 28 June were part of Operation Charnwood, fighting a battle at Château de la Londe, which left 161 dead on the British side. His company liberated Flers and moved on towards Belgium and the Netherlands.

The 1st Battalion were supposed to meet airlifted troops at Arnhem as part of Operation Market Garden, which failed however. During battles in the Netherlands Mayhew's company took part in the liberation of Weert (22 September), Venray and Overloon (16–19 October). In Weert, Captain Mayhew was assisted by local resistance fighters. To locate German positions they often had to expose themselves to enemy fire, which resulted in several injuries among the company. On 16 October 1944, during the Battle of Overloon, Mayhew was injured by shells while creating bridges for tanks across a stream at Venray. He was sent to a hospital in Brussels, but returned to his company, against the orders of his doctors, in fear that his command might be given away to someone else. On 25 February 1945 he was again injured while advancing towards the Rhine, and was evacuated back to the United Kingdom.

== Knighthood ==
After the Second World War the government of the Netherlands wished to reward foreign soldiers for their services in liberating the country. They requested that foreign governments send recommendations for honours. In October 1945, the United Kingdom recommended Mayhew for the Order of the Bronze Lion or Medal of the Bronze Cross. The Dutch government however decided that a higher honour should be awarded. On 24 April 1946, by Royal Decree, Mayhew was knighted by Queen Wilhelmina of the Netherlands, receiving the Knight fourth class of the Military William Order. The Order is the highest and oldest military honour of the Kingdom of the Netherlands, bestowed for "performing excellent acts of Bravery, Leadership and Loyalty in battle". In the words of the royal decree:

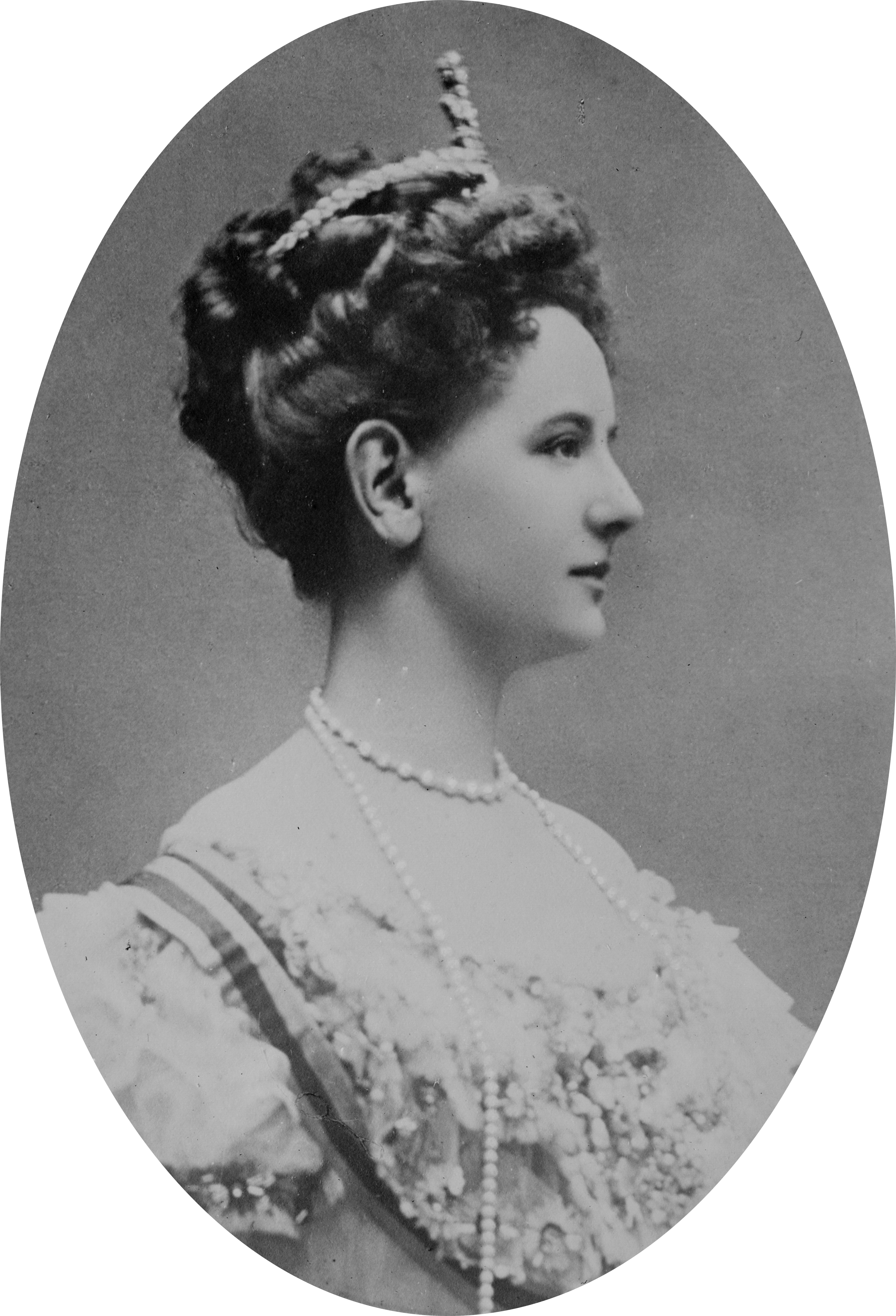
Queen Wilhelmina of the Netherlands

During combat to liberate occupied Dutch territory he [Mayhew] distinguished himself by committing excellent acts of bravery, leadership and loyalty. Moreover he displayed an extraordinary sense of duty and great perseverance, and was in every way, through praiseworthy example, an inspiration to all in those glorious days.

— Queen Wilhelmina of the Netherlands, Royal Decree of 24 April 1946

Due to his injuries Mayhew was unable to travel to the Dutch embassy in London. Instead he received the honour by mail. Prior to his death in 2021, Mayhew was the oldest of the remaining knights still alive.

== Later life ==
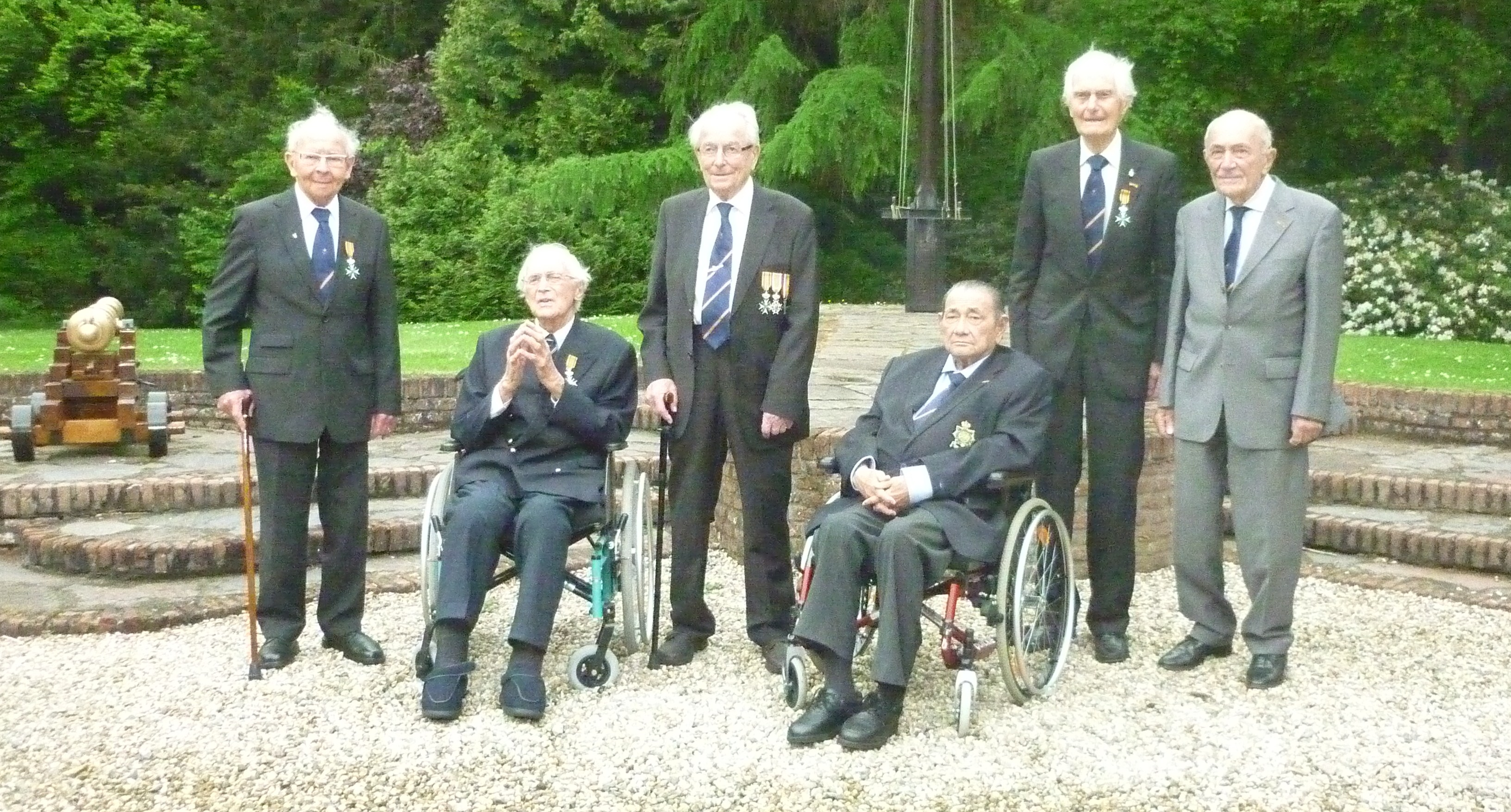
Mayhew (second from the right) with fellow knights of the Military William Order in 2012

After the war Mayhew became a representative in artificial fertilizers. In 1965, in honour of the 150-year anniversary of the Military William Order, Mayhew was received by Queen Juliana of the Netherlands at Huis ten Bosch. In the 1980s contact with the chapter of the order was lost when Mayhew moved. The last contact with the order was in 1982, when he received a book about the Military William Order by mail. Mayhew was eventually presumed dead and went unnoticed when he attended the unveiling of a monument in honour of the Suffolk Regiment in Weert in 1994.

While attending a memorial service at Venray in September 2011, Mayhew was seen by Dutch medal researcher Roel Rijks and Henny Meijer wearing the decoration of the Military William Order. Only seven knights were known to be alive at the time and held in the highest regard, with the knighting of Marco Kroon in 2009, the first new knight in over half a century, receiving broad national media attention. As such, the discovery of an eighth knight was widely published. The chapter of the order confirmed his membership and informed the Minister of Defence and Queen Beatrix of the Netherlands, the grandmaster of the order. The Dutch embassy in London sent a representative to Mayhew's home to reestablish contact. In May 2012 Mayhew visited the Netherlands where he was received by Queen Beatrix. He met with the other Dutch knights, and was presented with an appreciation medal from the municipality of Venray.

Since 2012 Mayhew visited the Netherlands several times and was active as a member of the Military William Order. In May 2013 he was an honorary guest at the annual Liberation Day ceremony in Wageningen, and visited the Overloon War Museum. In May 2014 Mayhew opened the annual Liberation Day celebrations in Wageningen, attended by over 1800 veterans and 120,000 visitors. Later that month Mayhew baptised tulips in London, a gift from the Netherlands to mark the 70-year anniversary of Operation Market Garden, attended by representatives from the Dutch, British, Australian, Canadian, New Zealand, Polish and US armed forces. On 6 December 2014 he was an honorary guest at the knighting of Gijs Tuinman, one of only two knights present, out of only four alive at the time. The event, which was broadcast live on Dutch national television, saw Mayhew welcoming Tuinman as a new member of the order. In honour of his 100th birthday, King Willem-Alexander of the Netherlands sent Mayhew a congratulatory letter in January 2017, which was delivered by the Dutch ambassador to the United Kingdom. Mayhew was a guest at Buckingham Palace during the state visit of King Willem-Alexander of the Netherlands and Queen Máxima to the United Kingdom in October 2018. In 2018 a book was published about his life with an introduction by king Willem-Alexander of the Netherlands.

As a D-Day veteran and member of Suffolk Regiment, Mayhew attended several memorial services in Normandy in 1994, 2004 and 2014. These services were organised by a local association called "Les Amis du Suffolk Régiment" (French: Friends of the Suffolk Regiment) and the municipality of Colleville-Montgomery, which was liberated by the Suffolk Regiment in 1944. In 2014, Mayhew met with a former German defender of Hillman Battery and also with a grandson of Colonel Ludwig Krug, the commander of Hillman Battery.

== Personal life ==
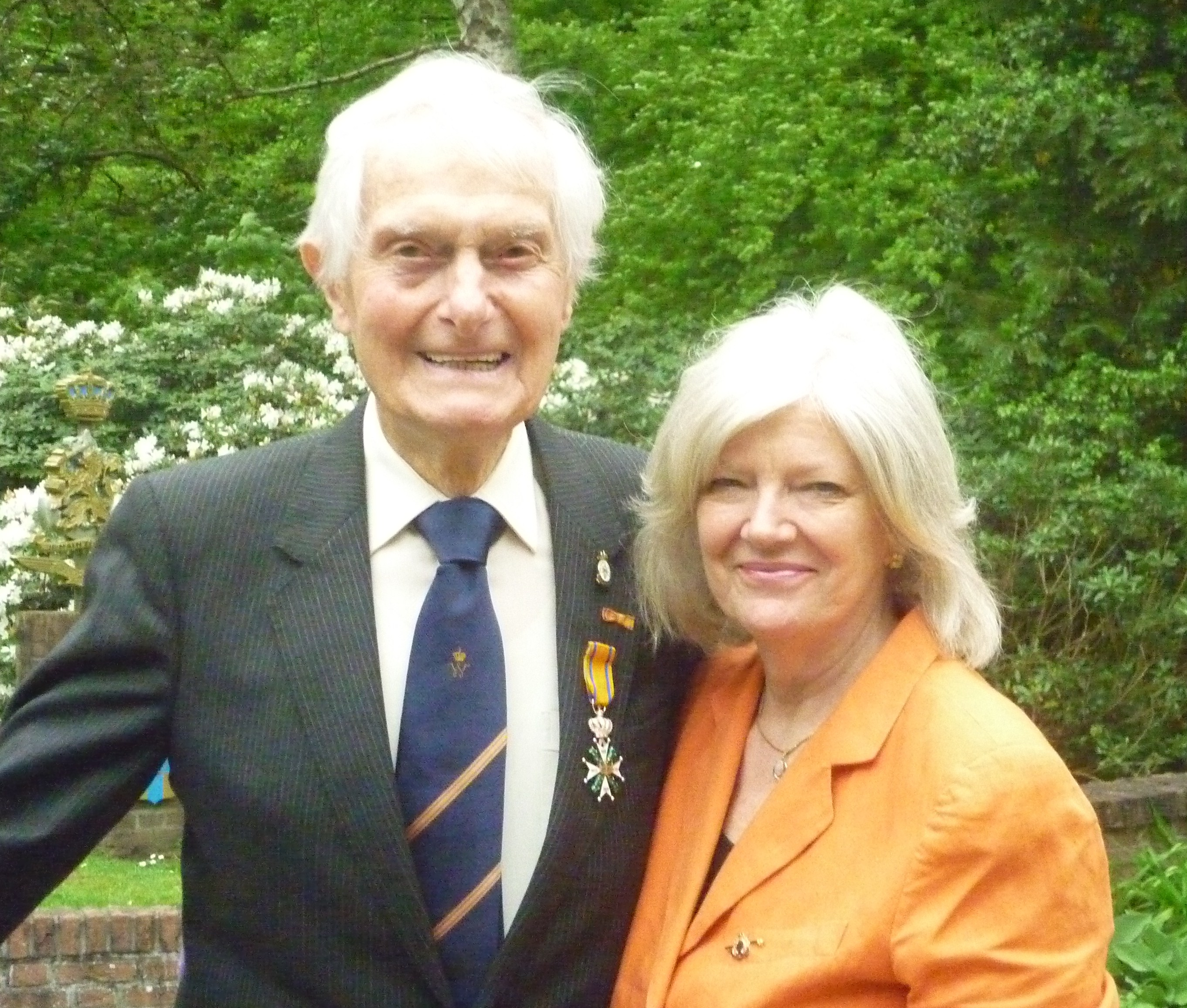
Mayhew and his wife Patricia in 2012

Mayhew was married in 1939 to Rosalie Elizabeth "Betty" née Howell, now deceased. He had three children from his marriage to Betty, a son Roger, born in 1940 and twin daughters, Susan and Gillian born in 1945. He had six grandchildren from their marriage and had several great-grandchildren. He married his second wife Patricia after Betty died aged 79. Mayhew died on 13 May 2021, aged 104.

== Military ranks ==
As a commissioned officer (#130441) Mayhew held the following ranks:

- Second lieutenant, 11 May 1940
- War substantive lieutenant, 11 November 1941
- Temporary captain, 11 December 1941
- War substantive captain, 3 February 1945
- Temporary major, 22 August 1945

== Honours and medals ==
(ribbon bar, as it would look today)

United Kingdom

- 1939–45 Star, for operational service outside the United Kingdom
- France and Germany Star, for operational service in France, Belgium and the Netherlands
- Defence Medal, for service in the United Kingdom
- War Medal 1939–1945, for service in the Armed Forces

Netherlands

- Knight 4th class of the Military William Order (1946), for bravery, leadership and loyalty in battle
- Appreciation medal from the municipality of Venray (2012)

France

- Knight of the Legion of Honour

== Literature ==
- Aggelen van, L. (2018). Kenneth George Mayhew – Ridder Militaire Willems-Orde (in Dutch). Arnhem: White Elephant Publishing. ISBN 978-90-79763-21-4.
- Maalderink, P.G.H. (1982). De Militaire Willems-Orde sedert 1940 (in Dutch). The Hague: Sijthoff Pers. ISBN 978-90-70682-02-6.
