= 2006 Dutch/Australian Offensive =

Military offensive in Afghanistan

Coordinates: 32°50′49.999″N 66°2′59.999″E

- Part of the War in Afghanistan (2001–2021)
Date	Late April – 16 July 2006
Location	Chora and Baluchi areas, Oruzgan Province, Afghanistan
Result	Coalition victory: Taliban cleared out of the Chora and Baluchi areas; Disruption to Taliban supply routes

Belligerents
Netherlands; Australia; United States	(Afghanistan) Taliban insurgents

Commanders and leaders
(Netherlands) Marco Kroon	(Afghanistan) Unknown

Strength
2,000 soldiers One Dutch platoon One Australian platoon US air support	500–1,000 Taliban fighters (estimated)

Casualties and losses
1 Dutch soldier killed 7 Dutch wounded 6 Australians wounded	Over 300 Taliban fighters killed

The 2006 Dutch-Australian offensive was a military operation carried out in Afghanistan by a combined force of Dutch and Australian troops that commenced in late April 2006 and concluded on 16 July 2006. The force entered the Taliban-controlled Chora District and Balouchi region, both of which are located north-east of the provincial capital, Tarin Kowt. The offensive's goal was to protect Tarin Kowt, the site of a soon-to-be base, from a potential Taliban attack.

== Battle ==
=== Surk Murgab ===
The first action of the offensive occurred in late April, when Lieutenant Marco Kroon led a platoon consisting of twenty-nine Dutch Commando Corps (KCT) soldiers from "Task Force Viper", alongside twenty-nine Australian Special Air Service Regiment (SAS) soldiers, into the village of Surk Murgab (15 kilometres (9.3 mi) from Tarin Kowt). With the objective to ascertain the presence of an enemy force, the coalition troops entered the village. Upon their arrival they encountered intense fire. Threatened with being pinned down by the weight of the fire and unable to move, the contingent was forced to call in air support to enable them to break contact and withdraw.

A second attempt to secure the village was initiated four days later and, again, heavy fire forced the coalition force to withdraw. An Australian vehicle was unable to leave (the exact cause is unclear) and was a target for the Taliban. Using an armed diversion, the Dutch managed to distract the insurgents long enough to allow the Australians to repair their vehicle and pull back.

=== Chora Valley ===
The Dutch-Australian offensive moved north into the Chora Valley a month later. While moving through an open area devoid of cover, the joint force came under attack by the Taliban, who fired at them with mortars, RPGs and 107-millimetre rockets. At a tactical disadvantage, Kroon decided to call a halt to the advance, but the Australians, having suffered a casualty, were unable to break contact immediately and the Dutch troops were forced to move forward again to help them. Acting once again as a decoy force, the Dutch drew the attention of the Taliban while the Australians evacuated their wounded soldier. In response, the Taliban focused their fire more intensely upon the Dutch. The fire was of such weight that the Australians later claimed that at the time "they had not thought Kroon's platoon would make it".

The Dutch force were nevertheless able to make good their withdrawal and two weeks later the coalition troops re-entered the Chora Valley. As per their previous attempt, the Taliban reacted strongly and the Australian SAS members were soon placed under intense fire. Kroon sought to aid the Australian contingent, but the vehicle he was traveling in rolled over due to the rough terrain; the crew inside the upturned vehicle only narrowly escaped the mortars and shells that subsequently exploded in close proximity as the Taliban targeted their stricken vehicle.

As the Australians and Dutch attempted to interrupt a Taliban supply route, they were attacked again at short range in country that provided good cover for ambushes. Attempting to extricate his men from the trap, Kroon led them in a dangerous passage of lines manoeuvre that took them through the Australian positions, where the SAS troopers were returning fire. Moving back to higher ground, one of the Dutch vehicles was hit by an RPG, but it was able to continue on. The coalition force then established itself in a defensive position in preparation for further attacks; these came throughout the course of eight hours as, amidst 50 degree Celsius heat, they fought off the Taliban. By the end of the fighting a total of 13 Taliban soldiers had been killed.

=== Operation Perth and Operation Chitag ===
In mid-July, the Australians launched Operation Perth in an effort to remove the Taliban presence from the Chora Valley. As a part of this offensive, the Dutch were again involved, launching their own operation known as Operation Chitag. The operations occurred as part of a multi-national coalition operation to clear the Chora Valley, 40 kilometres (25 mi) north-east of Tarin Kowt, involving more than 500 troops from six nations. Units involved included elements of the 4th Battalion, Royal Australian Regiment and the Special Air Service Regiment and the Netherlands Korps Commandotroepen. Heavy fighting with Taliban insurgents resulted, and during the intense combat the Australians fought their way through the valley, clearing it in a series of synchronised and closely coordinated operations. Despite meeting stiff resistance from several hundred insurgents, the operation was ultimately successful with the Taliban sustaining heavy casualties and eventually fleeing the valley.

On the night of 12/13 July, a combined Dutch and Australian force, became surrounded by a larger Taliban force during an engagement north-east of Tarin Kowt. Running low on ammunition, their situation became desperate and air support from a US Air Force AC-130 gunship was called in. Armed with a "105-millimetre howitzer, 40-millimetre cannon and Gatling guns", the aircraft could deliver intense indirect fire support that could regain the initiative for the coalition troops and push the Taliban back from their position. By the time the gunship arrived over battle, the Taliban had advanced to within 30 metres (98 ft) of the coalition position. Despite the risk of collateral damage, Kroon proceeded to call down the gunship's fire. The incident was later described in an official Dutch report. "The air around the two platoons was thick with shrapnel but the 40-millimetre and 105-millimetre shells launched by the aircraft had a devastating effect on the Taliban".

Following the fighting, the Dutch and Australian units were able to continue their advance over the next four days, before the operation was successfully concluded. One Dutch soldier was killed during the offensive and at least 13 coalition soldiers were wounded, including six Australians.

== Aftermath ==
The joint offensive in the Chora and Baluchi areas was deemed a great success by the Dutch. Despite initial set backs, the "pass entering the valley was opened" and the coalition forces were eventually able to gain freedom of movement throughout the area. Casualties on the coalition side were light, with only one coalition soldier being killed and another being wounded; Taliban casualties were estimated by an official Dutch report as being "up to 300 killed". For his actions during the offensive, Kroon was later awarded the Military Order of William, the Netherlands' highest military decoration.
