= Roy de Ruiter =

Roy de Ruiter may refer to:

- Roy de Ruiter (aviator) (born 1981), Dutch major and knight in the Military Order of William
- Roy de Ruiter (footballer) (born 1989), Dutch football player
