= List of knights grand cross of the Military Order of William =

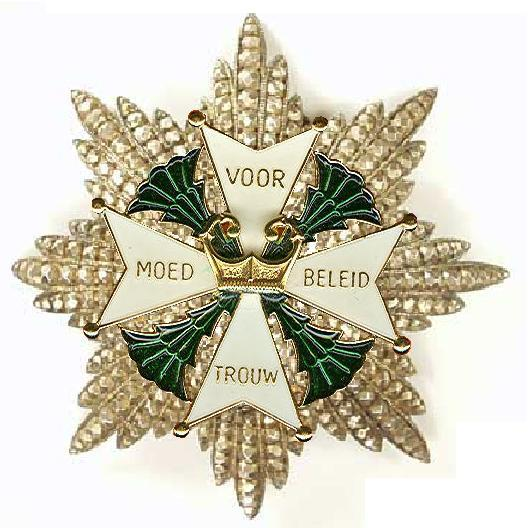
Knight grand cross's star

This is a list of knights Grand Cross of the Military Order of William. Established in 1815 by Willem I, it is the oldest and highest honour of the Kingdom of the Netherlands.

The order is only awarded for acts of extreme bravery. Yet in the 19th century, the rank of knight grand cross was commonly awarded to foreign monarchs as a mark of respect and diplomacy. It has not been awarded since 1954, yet the Dutch monarch, as sovereign of the order, wears the insignia of knight grand cross.

== Willem I ==
Image	Name	Life	Date	Country	Notes
	Willem, Prince of Orange	1792–1849	8 July 1815	Netherlands	Later Willem II, King of the Netherlands
	Jan Hendrik van Kinsbergen, Count of Doggerbank	1735–1819	8 July 1815	Netherlands	
	Jonkheer Jan Willem Janssens	1762–1838	8 July 1815	Netherlands	
	Leopold, Count of Limburg Stirum	1758–1840	8 July 1815	Netherlands	
	Arthur Wellesley, 1st Duke of Wellington	1769–1852	8 July 1815	United Kingdom	Also Prince of Waterloo in the Dutch nobility
	Prince Wilhelm of Prussia	1783–1851	8 July 1815	Prussia	
	Gebhard Leberecht von Blücher, Prince of Wahlstatt	1742–1819	8 July 1815	Prussia	
	Baron Friedrich Wilhelm of Bülow, Count of Dennewitz	1755–1816	8 July 1815	Prussia	
	Count August Neidhardt of Gneisenau	1760–1831	8 July 1815	Prussia	
	Prince Christian of Hesse-Darmstadt	1763–1830	3 August 1815	Hesse	
	Baron Karl von Vincent	1757–1834	3 August 1815	Austrian Empire	
	Karl Philipp, Prince of Schwarzenberg	1771–1820	27 August 1815	Austrian Empire	
	Prince Michael Andreas Barclay de Tolly	1761–1818	27 August 1815	Russian Empire	
	Karl Philipp, Prince of Wrede	1767–1838	27 August 1815	Bavaria	
	Wilhelm, Crown Prince of Württemberg	1781–1864	27 August 1815	Württemberg	Later Wilhelm I, King of Württemberg
	Jonkheer Theodorus Frederik van Capellen	1762–1824	20 September 1816	Netherlands	
	Edward Pellew, 1st Baron Exmouth	1757–1833	20 September 1816	United Kingdom	Later 1st Viscount Exmouth
	Alexander I, Emperor of Russia	1777–1825	19 November 1818	Russian Empire	
	Grand Duke Konstantin Pavlovich of Russia	1779–1831	19 November 1818	Russian Empire	
	George, Prince Regent of the United Kingdom	1762–1830	27 November 1818	United Kingdom	Later George IV, King of the United Kingdom
	Zeno Willem Anne Lodewijk van Tengnagell	1783–1836	24 May 1821	Netherlands	
	Friedrich Wilhelm III, King of Prussia	1770–1840	9 July 1821	Prussia	
	Cornelis Rudolphus Theodorus, Baron Krayenhoff	1758–1840	12 May 1823	Netherlands	
	Louis Antoine, Dauphin of France	1775–1844	13 May 1825	France	
	Charles X, King of France and Navarre	1757–1836	13 May 1825	France	
	Nicholas I, Emperor of Russia	1796–1855	11 May 1826	Russian Empire	
	Hendrik Merkus, Baron de Kock	1779–1845	25 October 1830	Netherlands	
	Prince Frederik of the Netherlands	1797–1881	18 August 1831	Netherlands	
	David Hendrik, Baron Chassé	1765–1849	25 December 1831	Netherlands	

== Willem II ==
Image	Name	Life	Date	Country	Notes
	Friedrich Wilhelm IV, King of Prussia	1795–1861	9 February 1842	Prussia	
	Louis Philippe I, King of the French	1773–1850	22 March 1842	France	
	Prince Bernhard of Saxe-Weimar-Eisenach	1792–1862	8 October 1842	Saxe-Weimar-Eisenach	Commander of the Royal Netherlands East Indies Army
	Grand Duke Michael Pavlovich of Russia	1798–1849	4 November 1843	Russian Empire	

== Willem III ==
Image	Name	Life	Date	Country	Notes
	Ivan Fyodorovich Paskevich-Erevansky, Prince of Warsaw	1782–1856	19 April 1849	Russian Empire	
	Franz Joseph I, Emperor of Austria, King of Hungary	1830–1916	21 June 1849	Austrian Empire	
	Frederik VII, King of Denmark	1808–1863	21 June 1849	Denmark	
	Oscar I, King of Sweden and Norway	1799–1859	21 June 1849	Sweden-Norway	
	Ernst August, King of Hanover	1771–1851	3 July 1849	Hanover	
	Alexander II, Emperor of Russia	1818–1881	13 September 1855	Russian Empire	
	Napoléon III, Emperor of the French	1808–1873	13 September 1855	France	
	Prince Aleksandr Ivanovich Baryatinsky	1815–1879	19 February 1860	Russian Empire	
	Jan van Swieten	1807–1888	12 May 1874	Netherlands	
	Albert, King of Saxony	1828–1902	9 July 1878	Saxony	
	Friedrich, German Crown Prince and Crown Prince of Prussia	1831–1888	23 August 1878	German Empire	Later Friedrich III, German Emperor and King of Prussia
	Prince Friedrich Karl of Prussia	1828–1885	23 August 1878	Prussia	
	Alexander III, Emperor of Russia	1845–1894	17 March 1881	Russian Empire	
	Wilhelm II, German Emperor and King of Prussia	1859–1941	8 September 1889	German Empire	Last awarded for diplomatic purposes

== Wilhelmina ==
Image	Name	Life	Date	Country	Notes
	Joannes Benedictus van Heutsz	1851–1924	14 March 1903	Netherlands	Governor-General of the Dutch East Indies (1904–1909)
	George VI, King of the United Kingdom	1895–1952	1 July 1946	United Kingdom	
	Franklin D. Roosevelt	1882–1945	15 April 1948	United States	Posthumously awarded

== Juliana ==
Image	Name	Life	Date	Country	Notes
	Princess Wilhelmina of the Netherlands	1880–1962	4 September 1948	Netherlands	Upon her abdication as Queen of the Netherlands
	Haile Selassie, Emperor of Ethiopia	1892–1975	3 November 1954	Ethiopian Empire	

== See also ==
- List of recipients of the Order of the Netherlands Lion
