= Christophe van der Maat =

Dutch politician (born 1980)

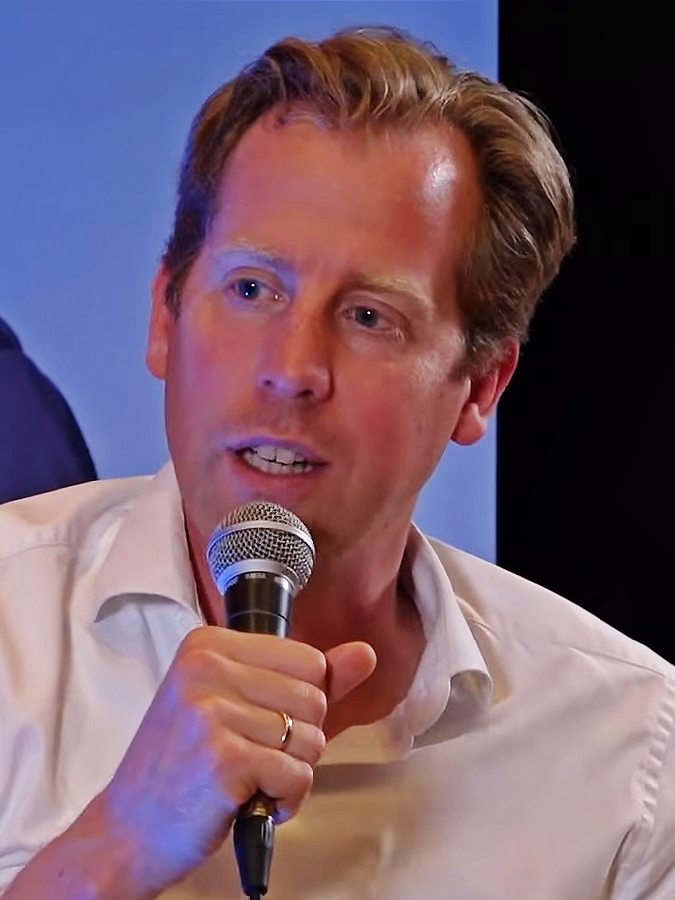
- Van der Maat in 2022

State Secretary for Defence
- In office 10 January 2022 – 2 July 2024
- Prime Minister: Mark Rutte
- Minister: Kajsa Ollongren
- Preceded by: Barbara Visser
- Succeeded by: Gijs Tuinman

Member of North Brabant provincial executive
- In office 22 May 2015 – 9 January 2022

Member of North Brabant provincial council
- In office 2015–2015
- In office 2019–2019

Personal details
- Born: Christophe van der Maat; 29 October 1980 (age 45) Boxmeer, Netherlands
- Citizenship: Kingdom of the Netherlands
- Party: People's Party for Freedom and Democracy
- Children: 1
- Education: Tilburg University (mr., drs.)
- Occupation: Politician; Jurist; Civil servant
- Website: Official website

Christophe van der Maat (born 29 October 1980) is a Dutch politician of the People's Party for Freedom and Democracy (VVD). From January 2022 until July 2024, he served as State Secretary for Defence.

== Early life and education ==
Van der Maat was born on 29 October 1980 in Boxmeer. From 1993 till 2000 he went to the Elzendaalcollege for his HAVO and VWO. From 2000 to 2006 he studied at the University of Tilburg, Dutch law (2000-2002), Public administration (2002-2005) and Master's in Constitutional Principles of International and European Law (2005-2006).

== Political career ==
=== Provincial politics ===
In 2015 and 2019 van der Maat was a member of the provincial council of North Brabant. Being the lead candidate from the VVD in North Brabant during the 2019 Dutch provincial elections. From 2015 till 2022 he was also a member of the North Brabant provincial executive, with responsibility for mobility, provincial organisation, knowledge institutions and cooperation (2015-2019) and for mobility, finance and provincial organisation and First Deputy King's Commissioner (2019-2022).

=== State Secretary of Defence, 2022–2024 ===
On 10 January 2022 van der Maat was appointed State Secretary for Defence in the fourth Rutte cabinet.

He was succeeded by Gijs Tuinman on 2 July 2024, when the Schoof cabinet was sworn in.

== Personal life ==
Van der Maat is married and has one child.

Political offices
Preceded by Barbara Visser	State Secretary for Defence; 2022–2024	Succeeded by Gijs Tuinman
