= Operation Perth =

2006 military operation in Afghanistan

- Part of the War in Afghanistan (2001–2021)
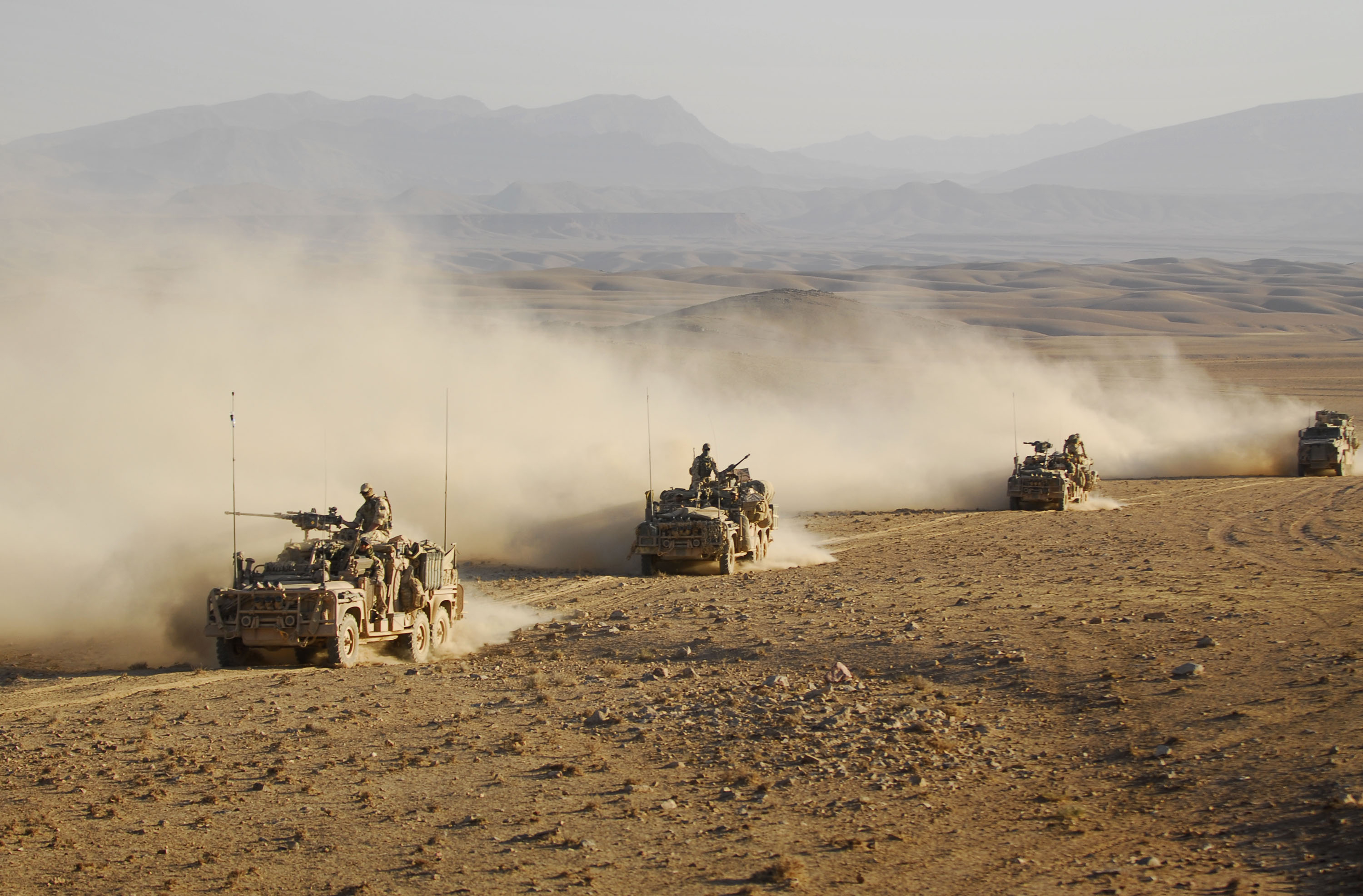
- Australian special forces in Afghanistan during 2009
Date	July 2006
Location	Chora valley, Orūzgān Province, Afghanistan
Result	Coalition victory

Belligerents
Australia; Netherlands; United States	(Afghanistan) Taliban

Commanders and leaders
(Australia) Mark Smethurst	

Strength
~300 special forces Air support	Several hundred insurgents

Casualties and losses
1 killed 13 wounded	150 killed

Operation Perth was an Australian military operation in Orūzgān Province undertaken in July 2006 during the War in Afghanistan. The nine-day search and destroy operation occurred as part of a wider 2006 Dutch/Australian Offensive to clear the Chora Valley, 40 kilometres (25 mi) north-east of Tarin Kowt, involving more than 500 troops from six nations, including the Netherlands Korps Commandotroepen. The operation was undertaken by the Australian Special Operations Task Group, including personnel from 4th Battalion, Royal Australian Regiment and the Special Air Service Regiment, under the command of Lieutenant Colonel Mark Smethurst. Fixed and rotary wing support was provided by a range of Coalition air assets, including Australian CH-47 Chinooks from the 5th Aviation Regiment. Heavy fighting with Taliban insurgents resulted, and during the intense combat the Australians fought their way through the valley, clearing it in a series of synchronised and closely coordinated operations. Despite meeting stiff resistance from several hundred insurgents, the operation was ultimately successful with the Taliban sustaining heavy casualties and eventually fleeing the valley.

During the later stages of the operation a Coalition force came under heavy rocket-propelled grenade, mortar and machine gun fire. Pinned down, an Australian commando platoon fought its way across the valley in order to arrange its extraction. The Taliban force resisted strongly, firing repeated RPG volleys which resulted in the death of one soldier and the wounding of thirteen others, including six Australians. Despite losing a third of their strength the Australians continued the assault and amid heavy fighting the commandos successfully neutralised the insurgents before arranging the evacuation of the wounded. The fighting had been intense and a number of Australians suffered serious injuries, including one soldier whose jaw was blown off, while the company sergeant major suffered extensive leg injuries. One Commando received shrapnel damage to his foot which did not stop him from continuing on fighting. Another Commando, thrown to the ground by the blast, had serious lacerations to his arm and was seen by the medic in the heat of the battle. The interpreter received a wound to his buttocks and the explosive detection dog was rendered unconscious for a moment in the same blast. Meanwhile, three US AC-130 Spectre gunships ran out of ammunition for their cannon and machine-guns while supporting the Australians. Likewise the Australian long-range patrol vehicles also ran out of ammunition, including for their Javelin anti-armor missiles and machine-guns.

In total, six Australians were wounded during Operation Perth making it the bloodiest battle for Australian forces since the Vietnam War at the time. Yet ultimately, superior weaponry and overwhelming airborne fire support had allowed the Australians to destroy a large and well-armed Taliban force and a number of Australians later received gallantry awards for their actions during the fighting. Taliban losses were estimated at 150 killed.
