= Lilian Helder =

Dutch politician and lawyer

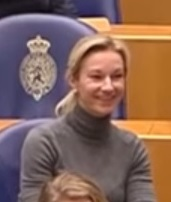

Member of the House of Representatives
- In office 17 June 2010 – 5 March 2025
- Succeeded by: Martin Oostenbrink

Personal details
- Born: Lilian Maria Johanna Sibertha Helder; 30 May 1973 (age 53) Venlo, Netherlands
- Party: BBB (2023–2025)
- Other party: PVV (2010–2023)
- Occupation: Lawyer • Politician
- Awards: Order of Orange-Nassau (2025)

Lilian Maria Johanna Sibertha Helder (born 30 May 1973) is a Dutch politician and former lawyer.

== Life and career ==
Helder was born in 1973 in Venlo, as an only child in Catholic family. She studied law at Radboud University Nijmegen. Helder worked at the municipality of Helden and for several law firms.

She became a member of the House of Representatives on 17 June 2010 on behalf of the Party for Freedom (PVV), focusing on matters of the judiciary. In September 2023, Helder switched to the Farmer–Citizen Movement (BBB), and she subsequently served as the party's spokesperson for justice, security, and the interior. She handed over part of her portfolio to Marieke Wijen-Nass when she entered parliament in July 2024. Along with Ulysse Ellian (VVD), Helder was rapporteur for the Committee for Justice and Security on the overhaul of the Code of Criminal Procedure, and she called in sick in December 2024, when her party decided that it would not prioritize the issue. On 3 February 2025, she announced her resignation from the House, citing irreconcilable disagreements with party leader Caroline van der Plas. In addition to her recent experiences, Helder was disappointed that she had not been included by the BBB in formation talks, and she revealed that she had not endorsed the resulting coalition agreement, discontent with its provisions on justice and security.

== Electoral history ==
Electoral history of Lilian Helder
Year	Body	Party	Pos.	Votes	Result		Ref.
Year	Body	Party	Pos.	Votes	Party seats	Individual	Ref.
2010	House of Representatives	Party for Freedom	3	5,793	24	Won	
2012	House of Representatives	Party for Freedom	4	3,794	15	Won	
2017	House of Representatives	Party for Freedom	9	3,130	20	Won	
2021	House of Representatives	Party for Freedom	9	3,458	17	Won	
2023	House of Representatives	Farmer–Citizen Movement	5	4,518	7	Won	
