= Roy de Ruiter (aviator) =

Dutch military personnel

Roy de Ruiter RMWO
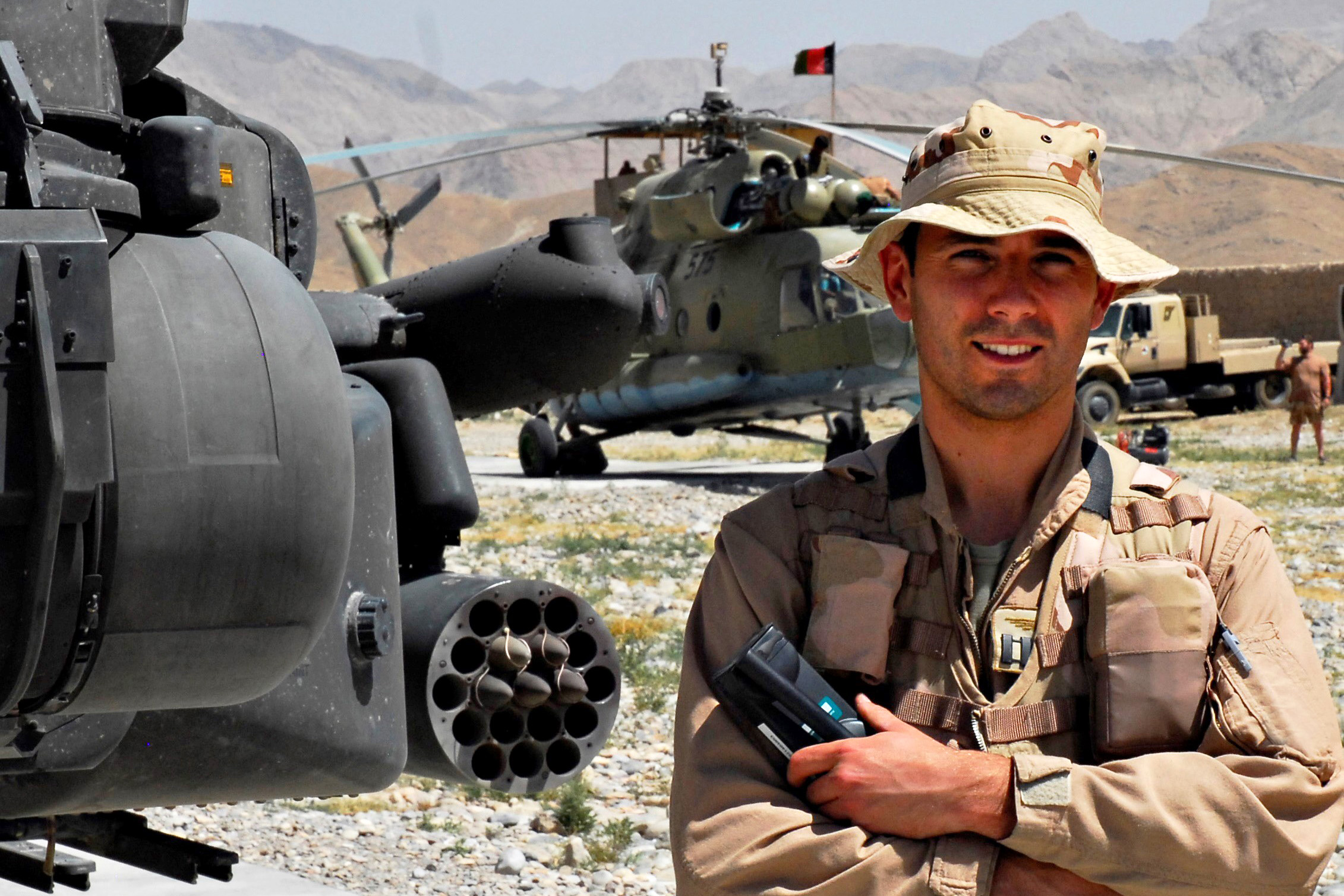
- Roy de Ruiter in Afghanistan
- Born: August 12, 1981 (age 45); Arnhem, Netherlands
- Alma mater: KMA
- Military career
- Allegiance: Netherlands
- Branch: Royal Netherlands Air Force
- Service years: 14
- Rank: Major
- Unit: 301 Squadron AH-64D Apache
- Awards: Military William Order, Knight 4th class

Major Roy de Ruiter, RMWO (born Arnhem, 12 August 1981), is a reservist pilot, active in civil aviation since 2013. De Ruiter is one of the only three living knights of the Military Order of William, the oldest and highest honour of the Kingdom of the Netherlands.

== Biography ==
De Ruiter applied to study flight in the Royal Netherlands Air Force at the age of 16 years in 1997. He was accepted to Koninklijke Militaire Academie in Breda in 1999. He completed training in 2001.

== Afghanistan ==
De Ruiter was deployed in Afghanistan for the first time in 2004. He had several tours to Afghanistan with last deployment in 2009.

== Military Order of William ==
De Ruiter received the highest military award for his service as an Apache pilot in Afghanistan. The service involved several heroic acts in the period from 2007 to 2009 when the Dutch army was deployed in the province of Uruzgan. Roy de Ruiter is the latest and one of three living recipients of the order.

== Civil career ==
De Ruiter was honorably discharged from the army in 2013 and started a career in civil aviation. He is currently an instructor pilot for the Royal Oman Police.

== Private life ==
Roy de Ruiter is married and has two children.
