= Marco Kroon =

Member of the Military Order of William

Marco Kroon RMWO
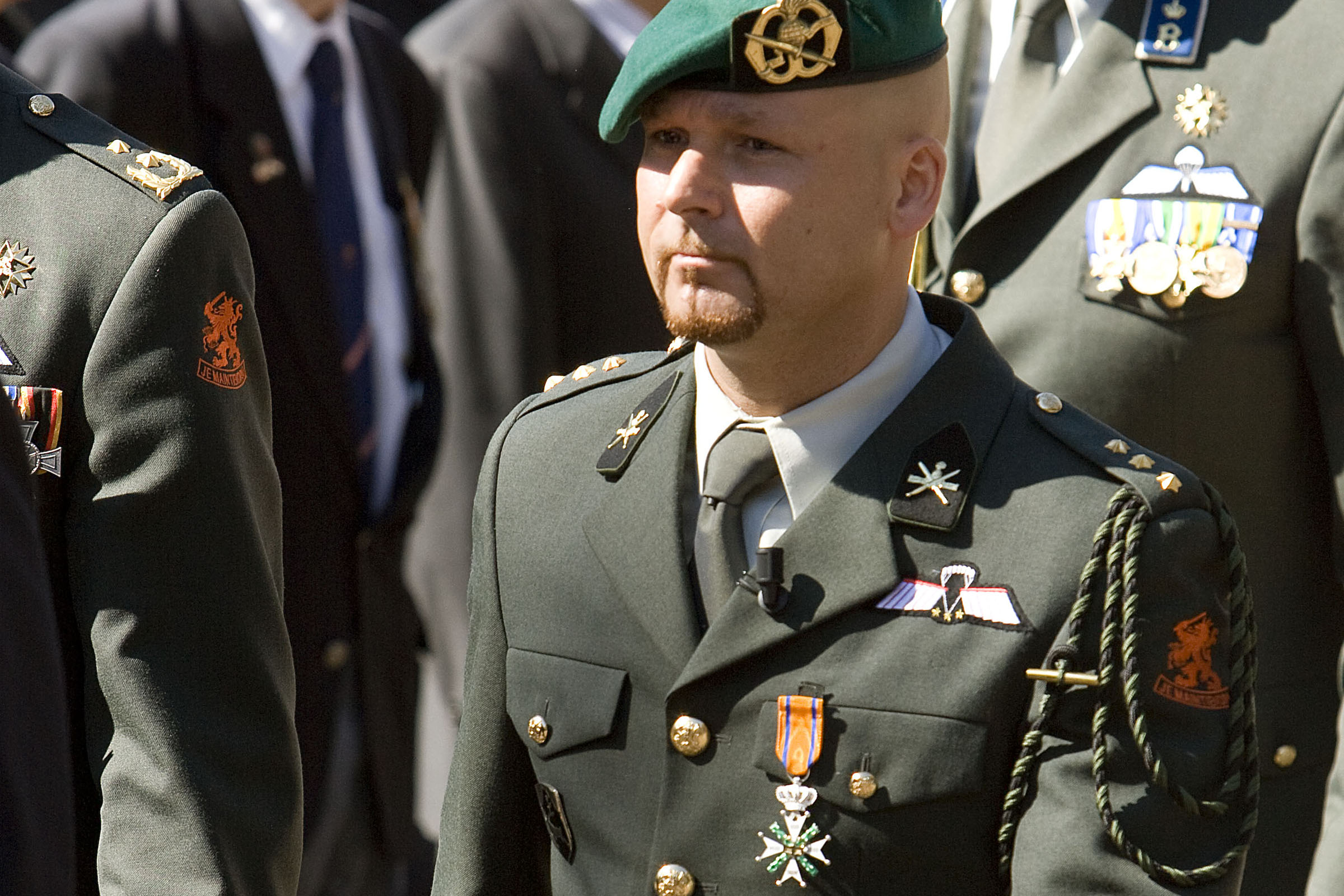
- Kroon in 2009
- Born: Marinus Johannes Kroon; 15 July 1970 (age 56) 's-Hertogenbosch, Netherlands
- Military career
- Allegiance: Netherlands
- Branch: Royal Netherlands Army
- Service years: 1989–present
- Rank: Major
- Unit: Korps Commandotroepen Garderegiment Fuseliers Prinses Irene
- Conflicts: Operation Provide Comfort; Bosnian War; War in Afghanistan
- Awards: Military William Order, Knight 4th class

Marinus Johannes "Marco" Kroon (born 15 July 1970), is a Dutch military officer serving with the Korps Commandotroepen. Kroon is one of only three living knights of the Military Order of William and the first new member appointed to this Dutch Order in over half a century. The Military William Order is the highest honour in the Netherlands, bestowed for "performing excellent acts of Bravery, Leadership and Loyalty in battle".

== Personal life ==
Marinus Johannes Kroon was born on 15 July 1970 in Den Bosch in the Netherlands. He graduated the Sint-Janslyceum, high school, in 1989. He still lives in Den Bosch with his girlfriend who runs a café. Besides his full-time job in the military, Kroon often helps her with her work.

Kroon also graduated from the Koninklijke Militaire School (Royal Military School, which trains NCO's) in Weert, and from the Koninklijke Militaire Academie (Royal Military Academy, which trains officers) in Breda.

== Military career ==
=== Marines ===
After graduating from high school in 1989, Kroon started his military career as a Marine in the Royal Netherlands Marine Corps. In 1991 he was dispatched for Operation Provide Comfort, a humanitarian operation for Kurds in northern Iraq. After this he was transferred for a year to the Marine Barracks Savaneta in Aruba. In 1993 he was sent out a second time as assistant section leader in a Marine platoon for the United Nations Transitional Authority in Cambodia (UNTAC) in Cambodia.

=== Army ===
After this mission in Cambodia he transferred to the Army where he started training for a position as an NCO at the Koninklijke Militaire School in Weert. After graduating he became squad leader at the 17th Armoured Infantry Battalion in Oirschot. With this unit he left for a mission in Bosnia for six months leading an infantry group.

In 1998 he transferred to the Korps Commandotroepen (Corps of Commando Troops) in Roosendaal. After successfully earning his Green Beret he fulfilled a management position in the corps. In 2000 he once again left for Bosnia, this time as a member of the Joint Commissioned Observer mission. After this mission he left again for the Koninklijke Militaire Academie (Royal Military Academy) in Breda, to become an officer. After graduation he returned to his unit, the 17th Armoured Infantry Battalion, and left for Bosnia for the third time, now as platoon commander, in the Stabilization Force (SFOR) mission.

In 2004 he returned to the Special Forces in Roosendaal as platoon commander at the 108th Commando Company. Here he had several management positions and was dispatched once again to Iraq in 2004 for mission Stabilisation Force Iraq and three times to Afghanistan (2005, 2006 en 2007).

After that Kroon became a staff officer at the intelligence centre of the special forces, training other commandos, testing equipment and tactical procedures.

On 12 July 2012, Kroon received a new command as company commander of the Charley Company of the 17th Mechanized Infantry Battalion 'Prinses Irene' Fusilier Guards Regiment based in Oirschot.

On 4 November 2013, Kroon returned to the Korps Commandotroepen (Corps of Commando Troops) in Roosendaal.

On 24 February the Telegraaf newspaper published an article about Kroon. It claimed that Captain Kroon would be joining the Dutch mission in Mali (MINUSMA). Based in Gao, in a staff function as a planner for the 105th Commando Troop Compagny, his job will be mainly planning long range reconnaissance missions. This news was confirmed by the commander of the Korps Commando Troepen, Colonel Jan Swillens.

In November 2014 Kroon was promoted to major and assigned to the Land Training Centre in Amersfoort.

=== Military William Order ===
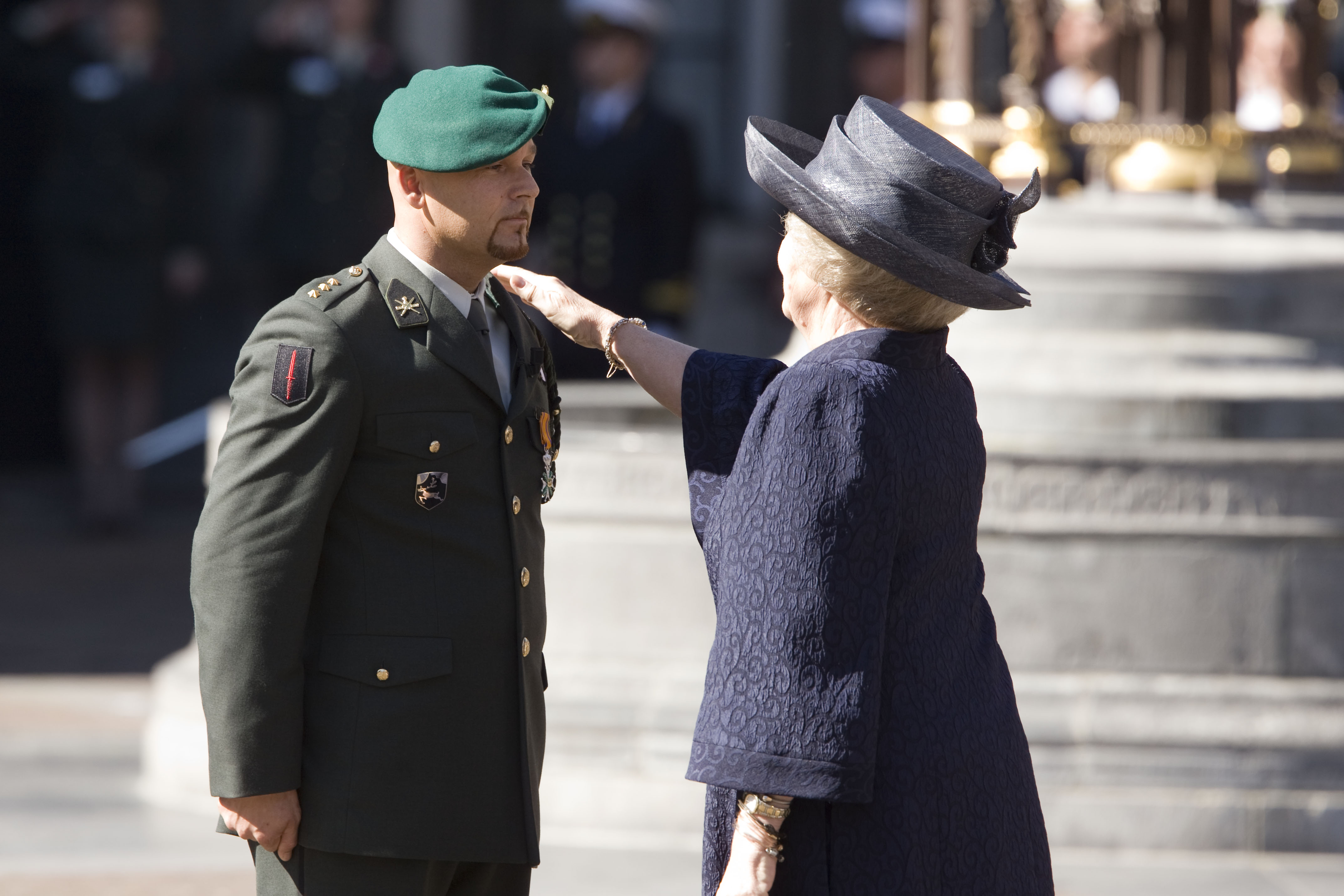
Kroon being awarded by Queen Beatrix of the Netherlands

From March 2006, to August 2006, Kroon, then a lieutenant, was dispatched to the Afghan province of Uruzgan. His job, as platoon commander of the Dutch special forces unit "Viper", was to reconnoiter and to map the area so that Task Force Uruzgan could be established. In this period he distinguished himself by exceptional deeds during six extremely dangerous actions which broke out during ISAF patrols by "Viper" and a platoon of the Australian Special Air Service Regiment.

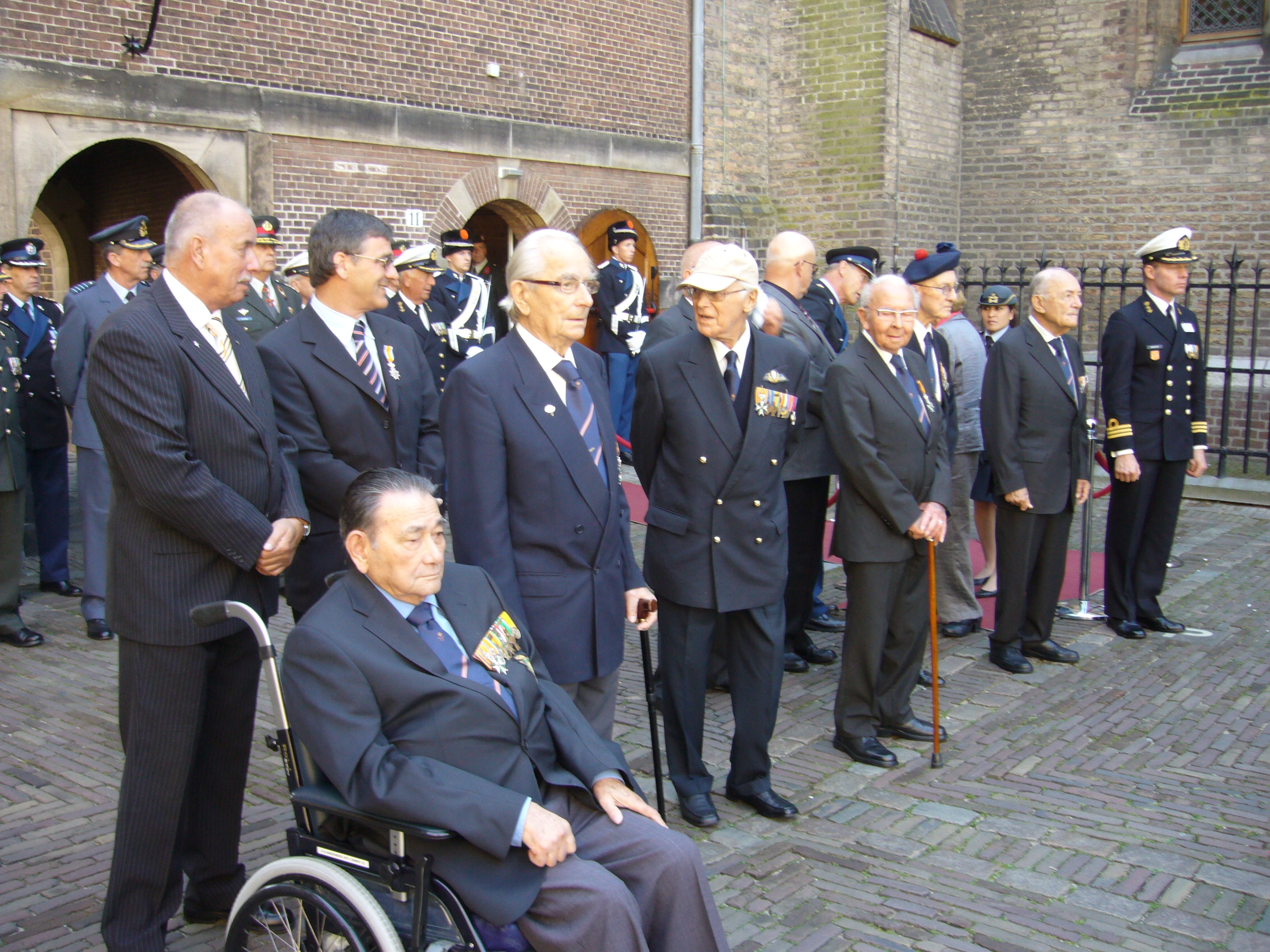
Previously knighted members of the Military William Order attending the presentation ceremony on 29 May 2009.

One of these actions was Operation Chitag (13–14 July 2006). During the patrol, Kroon encountered a group of Taliban fighters. In the ensuing battle, while the Dutch troops were heavily outnumbered, Kroon was forced to request air support on his own position by a Lockheed AC-130 gunship; he ordered his men to take cover and with his Forward Air Controller (FAC) guided the American air attack. At such close quarters, however, it was a harrowing experience for Kroon and his FAC. Later, his platoon was forced to take cover in an Afghan house, whence they repulsed repeated attacks during the night. No men fell under Kroon's command, but the resulting Taliban losses were severe. After the dawn, Kroon and his men emerged to retrieve intelligence from the dead Taliban to establish their identity. Kroon disciplined his men after noticing their agitation and inclination toward unprofessional behaviour (he later said that he understood the behaviour of his men but, as their leader, felt himself responsible for ensuring that the platoon acted professionally); he then ordered the wounded to be treated and the enemy dead to be covered. Kroon's superior officers later commended his leadership and ability to correct a battle-hardened group of commandoes.

These actions and his general behaviour as a leader were the reason both his subordinates and his superiors nominated Kroon for bestowal of the Military Order. The Ministry of Defence, after three years' research, recommended to Queen Beatrix of the Netherlands that Kroon be awarded the Military William Order for bravery shown during commando actions in Uruzgan. Queen Beatrix made Kroon a Knight (fourth class) of the Military William Order on 29 May 2009: the first time in 54 years that the honour had been given to an individual.

=== Killing incident ===
Early 2018 it became public that the public prosecutor (OM) had started an investigation regarding an incident from 2007 in Afghanistan, where Kroon was involved.

Kroon stated that he had killed an enemy, who during an earlier secret operation, had captured him and had subjected him to brutal interrogations, mistreatment and humiliation. In November 2018, Kroon stated for the first time that he had also been raped. After he was released for reasons unclear to Kroon, he wanted to take the man prisoner in turn. When he coincidentally encountered the man again, the man reached for a firearm, upon which Kroon shot and killed the man. Kroon kept the incident to himself due to the secrecy of the operation. He only reported the incident to the DoD early 2017, which informed the public prosecutor in January 2018.

In reaction to the publication by Kroon the TV programme Nieuwsuur started an investigation. The uncovered facts were to be published 24 February. The findings were presented to the DoD for comment. Upon this minister Bijleveld has strongly urged the editor of the show not to publish as some facts and details could endanger people's lives. In 2007, Kroon was on an intelligence gathering mission in the Afghan capital Kabul.

== Criminal investigation and conviction ==
In January 2010, Kroon and his girlfriend (aged 34) were named in a drugs case in The Netherlands. According to publications he was suspected of possession of drugs and of violating the gun law. A police investigation, which was sustained after two interrogations, was said to be focusing on the café named café Vinny's that he was running in the city of Den Bosch. The patrons were suspected of using cocaine in the café. The Koninklijke Marechaussee (Dutch military police) and the Public Prosecutor confirmed the suspicion. The investigations in the case started in October 2009 and in December 2009, four other suspects had been arrested.

Kroon and his lawyer Geert-Jan Knoops denied all accusations and announced their own investigation. According to Kroon, he is the victim of defamation. He points out that he received several anonymous mails with threats, one of them saying: "From hero to zero".

According to two sources, the Dutch Ministry of Defence was aware of the alleged reputation of Kroon's pub before he received his award for bravery in Afghanistan. The source of the accusations was believed to be an unmentioned police informer.

The publications on the suspicion of Kroon not only led to comments on the legitimacy of his award and speculations as to his professional position, but also to criticism directed at the mentioning of his full name by the press, which is uncommon in The Netherlands in crime reporting as it is considered to be an infringement of a suspect's personal privacy, related to the presumption of innocence.

In March 2010, Kroon's lawyer told a Dutch television programme that Kroon actually wanted his bar to be drugs-free and that he had thrown customers out who did not respect this policy.

On 20 September 2010, the Office of the Attorney General officially announced that Kroon would be prosecuted and was suspected of 'possession and provision of some (in the Netherlands illegal) electroshock weapons and possession of small quantities of hard drugs for personal use'.

The trial was held before the military panel of the Arnhem court, which consists of two professional judges of the Arnhem court of which one presides the panel, and one general officer who does not belong to the judiciary. It started on 29 November 2010. Court hearings were held on 4, 5, 11 and 12 April 2011 in Arnhem. The verdict of the military panel of the Arnhem court was on 22 April 2011. Kroon was sentenced a EUR 750 fine and a conditional 80 hours of community service for possession and provision of electroshock weapons. Kroon was acquitted on the drugs related charges. Kroon will not be dismissed from the military (this would be the case if he had been convicted for using hard drugs; the Dutch Ministry of Defence has a strict no-drugs policy). Furthermore, Kroon will keep his knighthood; revocation only occurs if sentenced to prison for more than one year. The Dutch Ministry of Defence reported that it perused the verdict and will wait out the period in which the Office of the Attorney General or Kroon can appeal the verdict. Kroon announced that he would voluntarily resign his knighthood if he was convicted for drugs related charges by the appellate court. On 2 May 2011 the Office of the Attorney General refrained to seek an appeal. Immediately after the legal procedure ending the Dutch Ministry of Defence announced they will consult Kroon in the near future regarding his career wishes and possibilities. Such consultations and consequent posting changes are normal procedure for all Dutch military personnel. According to his lawyer, Kroon aspires a new military mission, this after his current administrative posting.

== Continued legal action ==
On 13 July 2012, Geert-Jan Knoops (Kroon's lawyer) announced that Kroon will seek compensatory damages from the Dutch government after being prosecuted by the attorney-general of the Netherlands for possession of drugs. Knoops indicated that Kroon primarily wants an apology from the AG Office and that he had been negotiating with them for a year over this, but that a voluntary apology was not forthcoming. In lieu of this apology, Kroon has instructed Knoops to file a suit for unjust prosecution and is seeking compensatory damages for damage done to his reputation as well as for the loss of his cafe (which Kroon claims he had to sell at a loss because the public trial drove customers away).

== Honours and medals ==
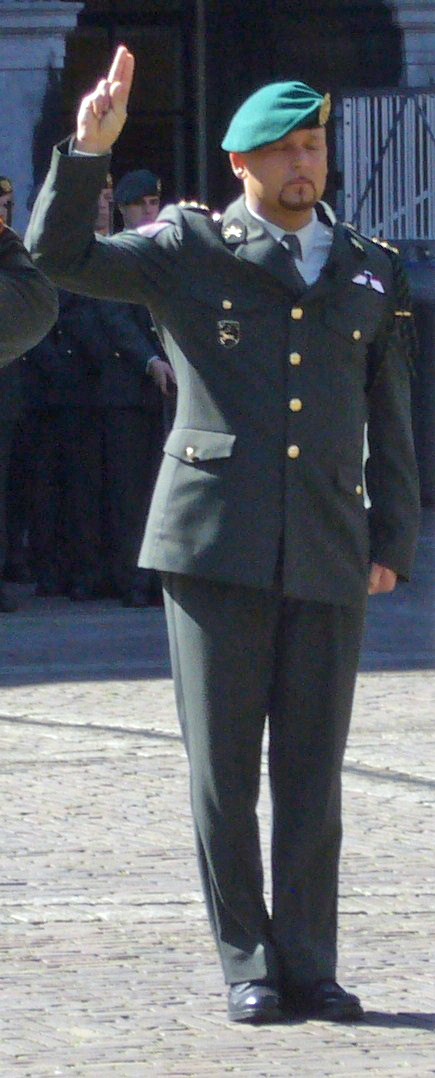
Marco Kroon taking the knighthood oath during the presentation ceremony of the Military William Order on 29 May 2009

- Knight 4th class of the Military William Order (RMWO)
- Commemorative Medal UN-Peacekeeping Operations, for participation UNTAC (Cambodia)
- Commemorative Medal Multinational Peacekeeping Operations, for participation Operation Provide Comfort (Kurdistan)
- Commemorative Medal Multinational Peacekeeping Operations, with 2 clasps for participation SFOR and Kosovo Force
- Commemorative Medal Peacekeeping Operations, with 5 clasps
- NCO Long Service Medal, in bronze (12 years service)
- Army Foreign Service Medal
- Four Day Marches Cross, 2nd participation
- Proficiency Medal of the Netherlands Sporting Federation, 2nd participation
- United Nations Medal for participation UNTAC (Cambodia)
- NATO Medal, with clasp for Former Yugoslavia service, granted twice
- NATO Medal, with clasp for Kosovo service
- NATO Medal, with clasp for ISAF service, granted twice

== See also ==
- Military William Order
- Task Force Uruzgan
