= Garderegiment Fuseliers Prinses Irene =

Princess Irene Fusiliers Guards Regiment
- Garderegiment Fuseliers Prinses Irene
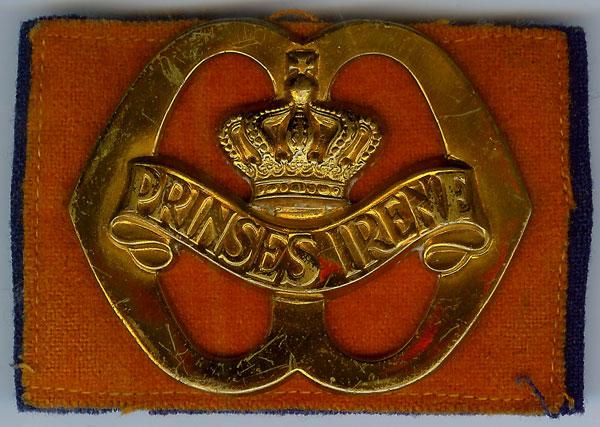
- Cap badge of the Garderegiment Fuseliers Prinses Irene
- Active: January 1941 – July 1945; April 1946 – present
- Country: Netherlands
- Branch: Royal Netherlands Army
- Type: Foot Guards
- Role: Infantry
- Size: One battalion One HQ staff company
- Part of: 13 Motorized Brigade
- Garrison/HQ: Generaal-Majoor De Ruyter van Steveninckkazerne, Oirschot
- Mottos: Volo et Valeo (I want it, so I can)
- March: The Irenemars
- Anniversaries: January 11, 1941

Commanders
- Current commander: Lieutenant colonel Henk de Boer
- Ceremonial chief: HRH Princess Irene of the Netherlands

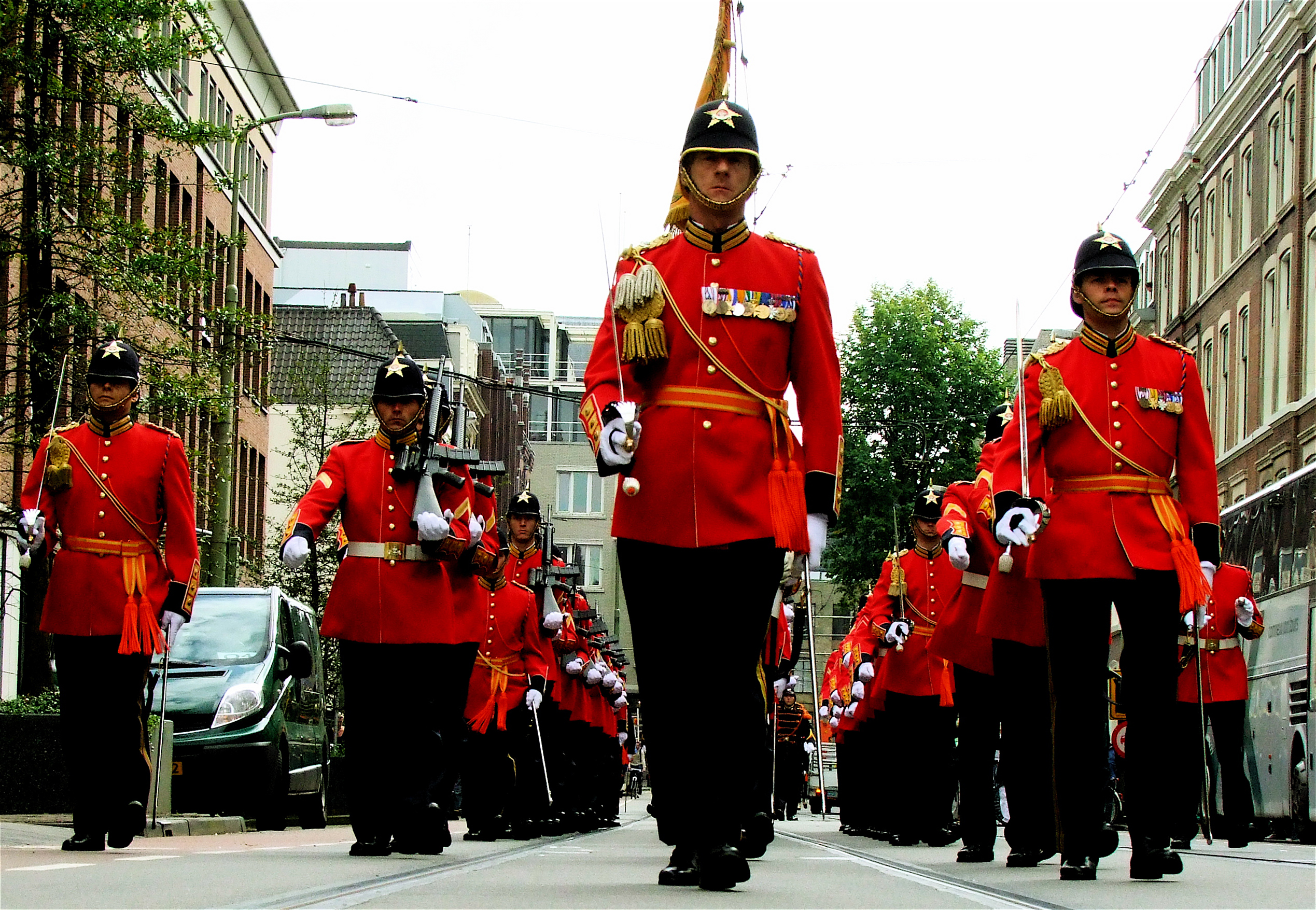
Fusiliers in The Hague on Prinsjesdag 2008

The Princess Irene Fusiliers Guards Regiment (Dutch: Garderegiment Fuseliers Prinses Irene) is a regiment of the Royal Netherlands Army, named after Princess Irene, the Granddaughter of Queen Wilhelmina, daughter of Queen Juliana, sister of Princess Beatrix and aunt of King Willem-Alexander. It is one of two regiments, along with the Garderegiment Grenadiers en Jagers, to be classed as 'Guards'.

== Regimental History ==
A group of Dutch soldiers were forced to withdraw in May 1940 after the unexpected invasion of the Netherlands by the Nazi armies. Faced by the choice: to surrender or to continue the fight alongside the Western Allies, they opted for the latter. Via several ways they finally arrived in Great Britain, where they formed a new unit: the Royal Dutch Brigade. The unit was later renamed to become the Royal Netherlands Motorized Infantry Brigade. In August 1941 this unit received from the hands of the Dutch Queen Wilhelmina, who remained in exile in England, its own regimental colors. In addition the unit was given the honorary name of 'Princess Irene', named after the Queen's second granddaughter. This name is also symbolic, as the name of Irene means: 'she who brings peace' (in Greek). As a small detachment in the British Liberation Army (the unit only numbered approximately 1400 men) the Brigade took part in the campaign in Western Europe. In May 1945 the Nazis capitulated in the Netherlands which also led to the disbanding of the Irene Brigade, which to a large extent was made up of war volunteers and conscripts. To remember their special bond, the men of 'the first hour' proudly wore their special distinction: an orange-blue lanyard called 'invasion-lanyard'. The regimental colors of the Royal Dutch Brigade 'Princess Irene' were decorated with the highest military order for valor known in the Dutch Army. So as not to let the name of that small Dutch unit fade into history, it was decided that the traditions surrounding the regimental colors were to be continued by a new regiment - the Princess Irene Regiment which was formed in April 1946 on the basis of the brigade.

Five battalions of the new regiment were on active duty during the so-called Police Actions in the years 1946-1949, during which the Dutch government tried to retake its former colonies of the Netherlands East Indies from the newly independent Indonesia. Ninety Dutch soldiers from this regiment were killed during these operations against the Indonesian independence movement.

The Regiment Princess Irene became Guards Regiment Fusiliers Princess Irene in 1948. The traditions of the regiment were carried on by 13th Armored Infantry Battalion of the Royal Dutch Army in the Westenbergbarracks in Schalkhaar (near Deventer). In June 1992 the 17th Armored Infantry Battalion took over the traditions. Since then, the regimental colors, monument and museum are settled in the General-major De Ruyter van Steveninckbarracks named after the commander of the Irene Brigade ) in Oirschot. 17th Armored Infantry Battalion Guards Regiment Fusiliers Princess Irene is part of 13 Motorized Brigade.

In June - December 1996 the battalion was transferred to Bosnia (former Yugoslavia). As 17 (NL) Mechanized Battalion Guards Regiment Princess Irene they served in the IFOR-II operation under British command, just as the Irene Brigade 50 years before them. In Bosnia the men and women of the battalion wore the invasion-lanyard of the former Irene Brigade on active duty. It was handed over to them by veterans of the brigade to illustrate the bond with their young colleagues. This was only the beginning of the peacekeeping operations for the Fusiliers. They went to Bosnia again in December - June 1999 as part of the SFOR5 force. June - December 1999 13 Fusiliers stayed on Cyprus, with UNICYP3. A Fusiliers company served in Kosovo (Jan - May 2000) with KFOR2. In December 2002 17 (NL) Mechanized Battalion Guards Regiment Princess Irene will stay in Bosnia for the 3rd time as part of SFOR13. Further missions were Iraq 2004 and 2005 and Afghanistan 2006, 2007, 2009 and 2016.

== Ceremonial uniform ==
When the regiment was promoted to the status of guards in 1948, they adopted a ceremonial uniform. To commemorate the unit's foundation in the United Kingdom, it was decided to adopt the style of the traditional British "full dress" infantry uniform, with a scarlet tunic and the dark blue "Home Service" helmet, which is also used by the Netherlands Marine Corps. The five-pointed star-shaped helmet badge commemorates the star used as a recognition emblem by the Allied forces in the North-West Europe Campaign of 1944–1945. The buttons of the tunic carry the Netherlands lion in relief. Only the upper button on cuff flaps carry the lion though the middle button has two crossed cannon barrels and the lower an antique helmet. They symbolize the infantry, artillery and engineers of the original unit. The lace on the collar signifies a Netherlands guards unit, while the cuffs are modeled on those worn by the British Guards Division. The retaining cord is a sign of commissioned rank and an indication of rank in the Netherlands army, additionally the sash is edged in gold to contrast with the tunic.

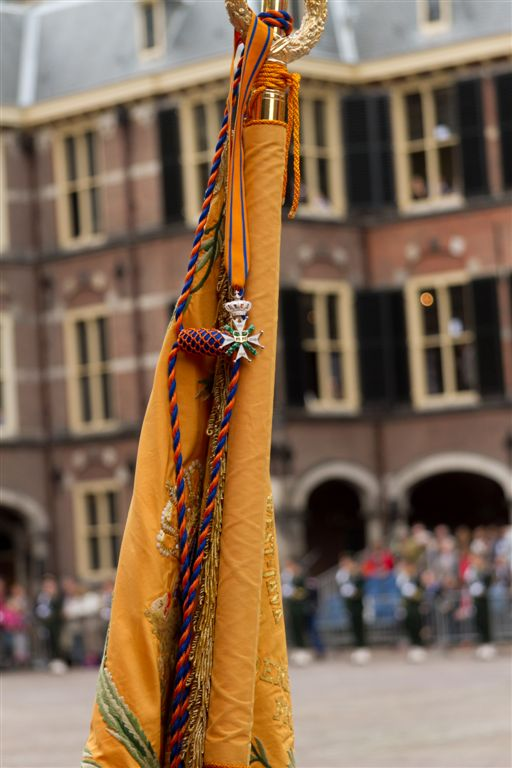
The Military William Order being carried on the Regimental Colour of the Guards Regiment Fusiliers Princess Irene

== Battle Honours displayed on the regiment's colour ==
- St. Come 1944
- Pont Audemer 1944
- Beringen 1944
- Tilburg 1944
- Hedel 1945
- West-Java 1946-1949
- Oost-Java 1947-1949
- Derafshan 2007

The Military William Order is attached to the colours.
