= Martin Oostenbrink =

Dutch politician (born 1987)

Member of the House of Representatives
- In office 5 March 2025 – 11 November 2025
- Preceded by: Lilian Helder

Personal details
- Born: 23 July 1987 (age 38)
- Party: Farmer–Citizen Movement

Martin Oostenbrink (born 23 July 1987) is a Dutch politician who served as a member of the House of Representatives between March and November 2025. From 2016 to 2025, he worked at the Ministry of the Interior and Kingdom Relations.
