= Military Order of William =

Oldest and highest honor of the Kingdom of the Netherlands

Military William Order Militaire Willems-Orde
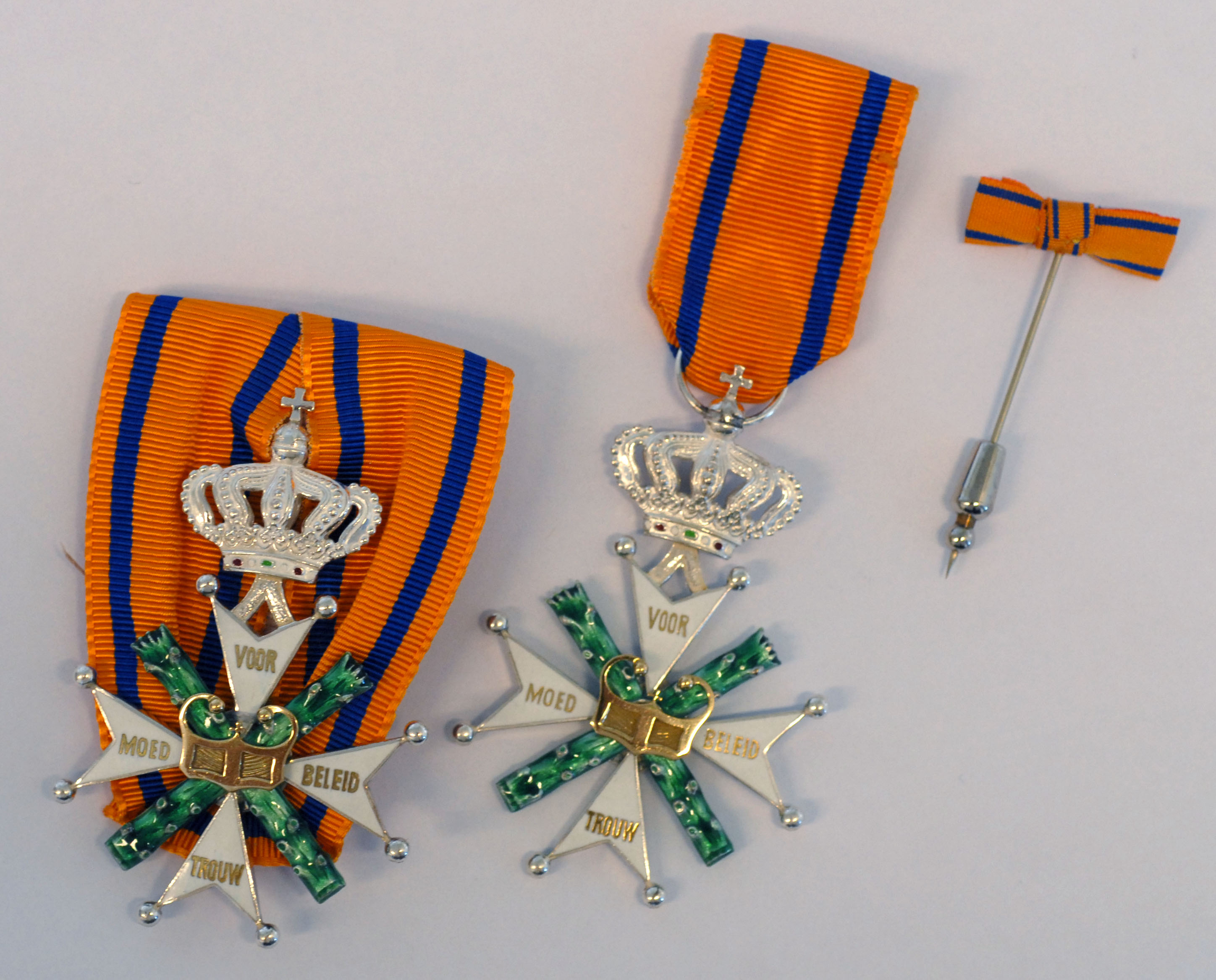
- Knight Military William Order 4th class medal (post 2000 model)

Awarded by King of the Netherlands
- Type: Chivalric order with four degrees
- Established: 30 April 1815
- Country: Netherlands
- Motto: Voor Moed, Beleid en Trouw (For Bravery, Leadership and Loyalty)
- Awarded for: Performing acts of excellent Bravery, Leadership and Loyalty in battle.
- Status: Currently constituted
- Grand Master: King Willem-Alexander
- Chancellor: Major general H. Morsink
- Grades: Knight Grand Cross; Commander; Knight 3rd class Knight 4th class Orange Lanyard (unit award)

Statistics
- First induction: William Frederick, Prince of Orange
- Last induction: Major Roy de Ruiter
- Total inductees: 5,877

Precedence
- Next (higher): None (highest)
- Next (lower): Cross for Courage and Fidelity
- Ribbon bar of Knight Grand Cross Ribbon bar of Commander Ribbon bar of Knight 3rd class Ribbon bar of Knight 4th class

The Military William Order, or often named Military Order of William (Dutch: Militaire Willems-Orde, abbreviation: MWO), is the oldest and highest honour of the Kingdom of the Netherlands. It is named after St William of Gellone (755–814), the first Prince of Orange. Its motto is Voor Moed, Beleid en Trouw (For Bravery, Leadership and Loyalty).

The chivalric order was established on 30 April 1815 by King William I and was presented for feats of excellent bravery on the battlefield and as a meritorious decoration to senior military officers. Comparable with the French Legion of Honour but far less often awarded, it is open to everyone regardless of rank or nobility—not only to Dutch military, but also to foreigners. To date, membership in the Order is extremely rarely awarded, and only for exceptional bravery in battle. Since its creation, more than 6,000 knights have been admitted to the Order. As of 2026 there are three living knights of Order, all Dutch: Maj. Marco Kroon, Lt. Col. Gijs Tuinman, and Maj. Roy de Ruiter.

In the spring of 1940 it was decided that civilians would receive the Order for heroic acts in the resistance. After the liberation of the Netherlands and the Dutch East Indies, several men and one woman from the resistance were awarded it.

== History ==
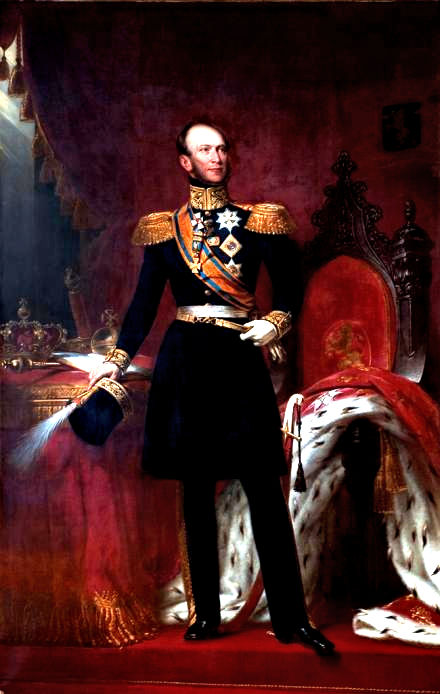
King William II as Sovereign of the Order

Most knighthoods of the Military Order of William were awarded in 1815 and shortly afterwards to military of the Allies that fought Napoleon at the Battle of Waterloo, in total 1,005 knighthoods were awarded at this time. The Knight Grand Cross was awarded to Prince William of Orange, the Duke of Wellington, Fürst Blücher von Wahlstatt, Graf von Bülow von Dennewitz and Graf von Gneisenau.

During the 19th century the Order was awarded to military serving in the campaign against the Belgian Revolution and military of the Royal Netherlands East Indies Army (KNIL) serving in the Dutch East Indies, mostly in the Aceh War. Until 1940, a total of 5,874 persons had been awarded the Military Order of William. In 1940, the Order was awarded to soldiers who had served with extreme valour in the defence of the Netherlands from the invasion by Nazi-Germany. In 1944 and 1945, with the liberation of the Netherlands from German occupation, the Order was again awarded, this time to Dutch citizens as well as members of the Allied forces for deeds of gallantry. Of the 3,500 servicemen who served in the Netherlands United Nations Detachment in the Korean War, three servicemen – two posthumously – were admitted to the Order. Since 1940, 199 names have been added to the register of the Military Order of William. The latest conflict that has been cause for the honour to be awarded was the war in Afghanistan.

On 29 May 2009 a ceremony was held at which the knights met, at Queen Beatrix's bestowal of the knighthood (fourth class) of the Order on Marco Kroon, platoon commander with the Korps Commandotroepen, at the Binnenhof, in The Hague. Kroon was honoured for conspicuous bravery, leadership, and devotion to duty during his service in Afghanistan from March to August 2006. The knights met on 4 December 2014 at King Willem-Alexander's bestowal of the knighthood (fourth class) of the Order on Gijs Tuinman, commander with the Korps Commandotroepen, at the Binnenhof, in The Hague. The knights met on 31 August 2018 at King Willem-Alexander's bestowal of the knighthood (fourth class) of the Order on Roy de Ruiter, (reserve-) Major, Royal Netherlands Air Force. Maj. Kenneth Mayhew, 101 at the time, was unable to attend the ceremony on 31 August 2018, which he explained in an interview broadcast on Dutch national television during the ceremony.

== Ranks ==
By 1945, the following classes of the Military William Order were in existence.

- Knight Grand Cross – wears the badge on a sash on the right shoulder, plus the star on the left chest;
- Commander – wears the badge on a necklet, plus an identical breast cross on the left chest;
- Knight 3rd class – wears the badge on a ribbon with rosette on the left chest;
- Knight 4th class – wears the badge on a ribbon on the left chest.

The rank of Knight Grand Cross could also be awarded as an exceptional presentation to heads of state which had displayed feats of loyalty to the Netherlands during wartime. Only the US President Franklin Delano Roosevelt, the Ethiopian Emperor Haile Selassie, and the British King George VI were conferred such an honour in the 20th century. In the 19th century, the Knight Grand Cross was often conferred on foreign monarchs as a mere mark of respect.

The 4th class could also be awarded as a unit presentation to military commands which had displayed feats of gallantry during wartime.

Knight Grand Cross (badge with sash and accompanying star)	Commander (badge with necklet and breast cross)	Knight 3rd class (badge with ribbon)	Knight 4th class (badge with ribbon)

== Insignia ==
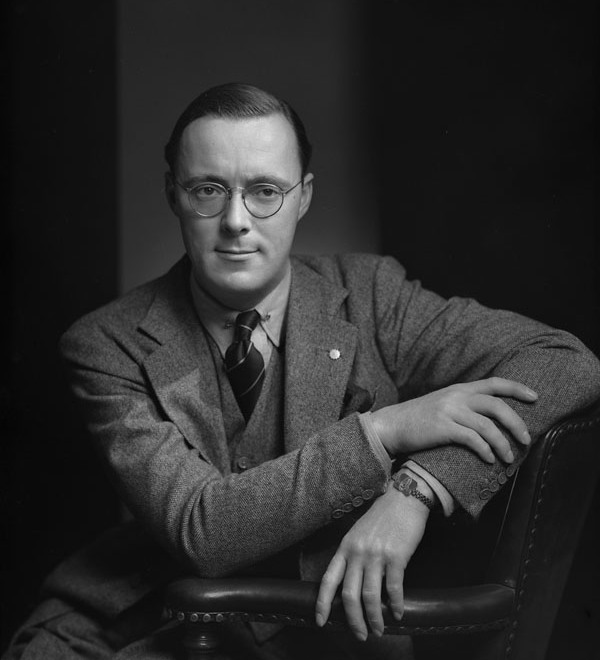
Prince Bernhard of Lippe-Biesterfeld, Commander of the Military Order of William

The badge of the Order is a white-enamelled Maltese Cross, in silver for the 4th class and in gilt for higher classes; a green enamelled Burgundy Cross appears between the arms of the Maltese Cross. The obverse bears a golden firesteel at the centre, and the motto Voor Moed – Beleid – Trouw (For Bravery – Leadership – Loyalty) on the arms of the Maltese Cross. Both the Burgundy Cross and the firesteel were symbols of the House of Valois-Burgundy during their lordship of the Netherlands and probably are meant to recall its crucial unifying role in the history of the Netherlands. The reverse central disc bears a crowned monogram "W" (for King William I) surrounded by a laurel wreath. The badge hangs from a royal crown.

The star of the Knight Grand Cross is a silver, 8-pointed star with straight rays; the obverse of the badge of the Order, minus the crown, appears at its centre.

The breast cross of the Commander is completely identical to the obverse of the badge of the Order.

The ribbon of the Order is orange (House of Orange-Nassau) with blue (Nassau-blue) stripes near the border.

== Knighthood oath ==
The oath to be taken by the accolade to the Military Order of William states: "I swear that I shall conduct myself as a faithful and valiant Knight, to stand ever ready to defend King and Country with my Life, and with all my Powers to always strive to be worthy of this Distinction, which the King has bestowed upon me. So help me God almighty."

== Unit award ==
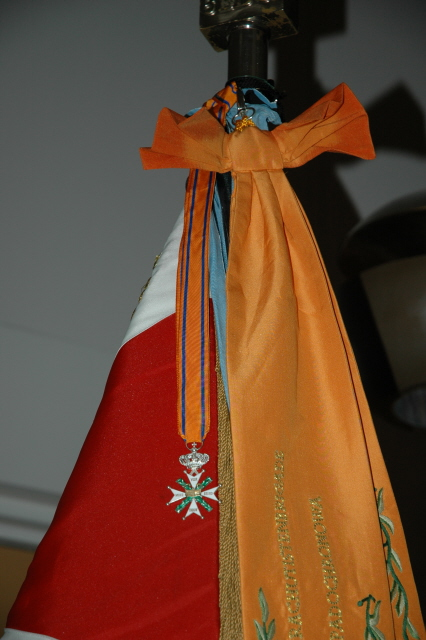
Military William Order awarded to the Polish 1st Independent Parachute Brigade, 31 May 2006

To be awarded the Military William Order a military unit must distinguish itself in battle to such a degree as would warrant the personal presentation of the Military William Order. The unit's Regimental Colour are decorated with the badge of the 4th class itself, which hangs from the finial of the pike. The version of the Military William Order for unit members is known as the Orange Lanyard. Only those who served in a military unit at the particular time of action are entitled to wear the Orange Lanyard.

The Orange Lanyard is worn as a cord around the right shoulder and can be worn simultaneously with the French or Belgian Fourragère of the Croix de Guerre. The Orange Lanyard is considered a permanent decoration and is worn for the duration of a military member's career.

The military units or formations that were awarded the Military William Order or continue their traditions are:

- The 7th Field Battalion of the Royal Netherlands Indies Army (KNIL) (1849) – no longer existing
- The 3rd Field Battalion of the Royal Netherlands Indies Army (KNIL) (1877) – no longer existing
- The Marechaussee Corps of Aceh and Dependencies of the Royal Netherlands Indies Army (KNIL) (1930) – no longer existing
- The Royal Netherlands Air Force, continuing the traditions of:
  - the Military Air Arm in the Netherlands (18 May 1940) – no longer existing
  - the Military Air Arm of the Royal Netherlands Indies Army (KNIL) (1942) – no longer existing
- The Royal Netherlands Naval Aviation Service of the Royal Netherlands Navy (1942)
- The U.S. 82nd Airborne Division for gallantry during Operation Market Garden (1944)
- The 'Prinses Irene' Fusilier Guards Regiment, continuing the traditions of the Royal Netherlands 'Prinses Irene' Brigade (1945)
- The Royal Netherlands Marine Corps (1946)
- The Royal Netherlands Navy Submarine Service of the Royal Netherlands Navy (1947)
- The 'Van Heutsz' Regiment of the Royal Netherlands Army, continuing the traditions of the Royal Netherlands Indies Army (KNIL) (1972)
- The Polish 6th Airborne Brigade continuing the traditions of the Polish 1st Independent Parachute Brigade for gallantry during Operation Market Garden in 1944 (31 May 2006) – no longer existing
- The Korps Commandotroepen (15 March 2016)

Most military units or formations of the Netherlands and foreign armed forces were decorated as a consequence of their actions during the Second World War. In 2016 the Korps Commandotroepen were awarded the Military William Order for their actions in Afghanistan.

== Current living members ==
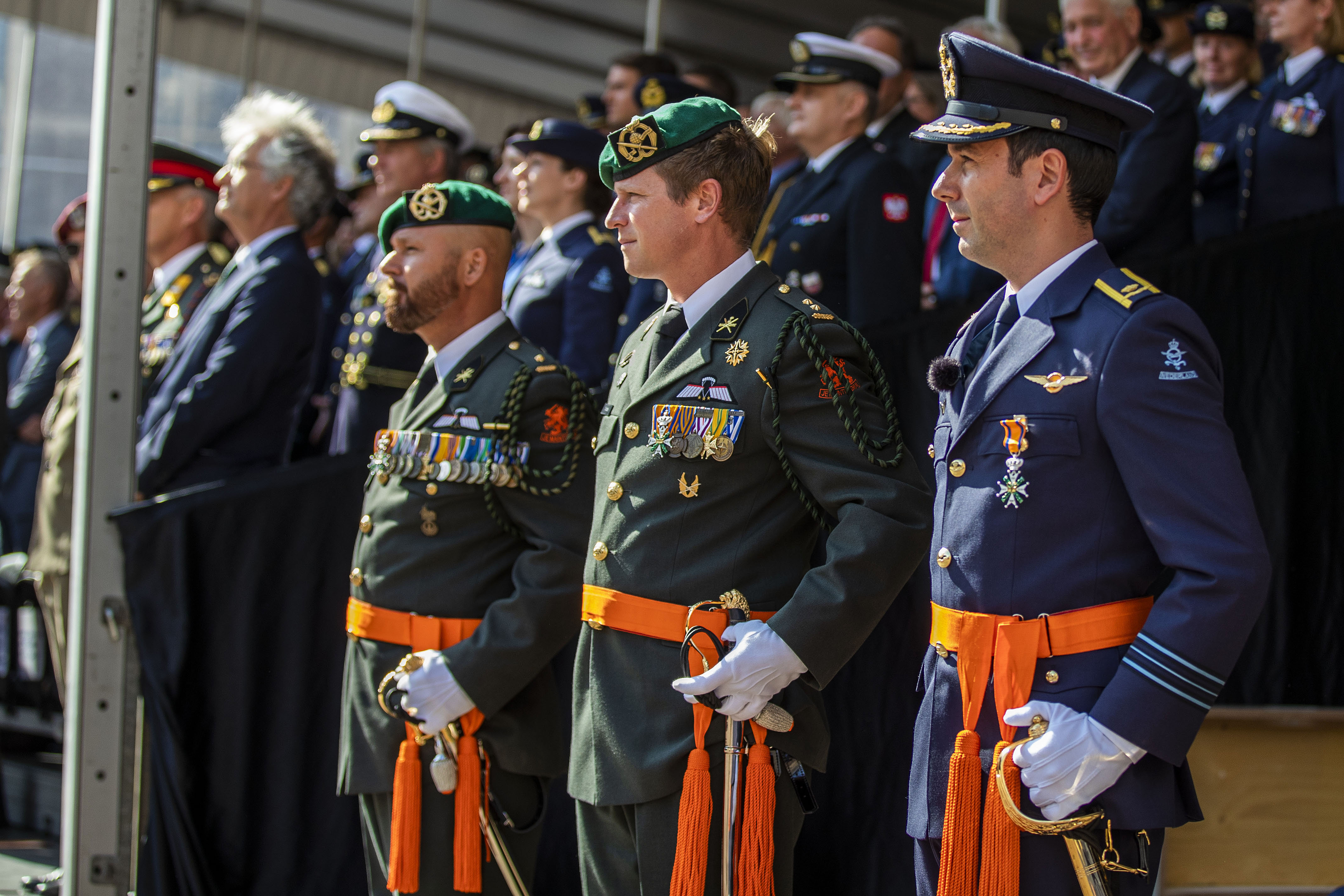
Left to right: Maj. Marco Kroon, Lt. Col. Gijs Tuinman, Maj. Roy de Ruiter.

As of 2026, there are only three living knights of the Military Order of William, all Dutch. Below a list of the names of the living Knights, with the date of their induction in parentheses:

- Netherlands: Maj. Marco Kroon (29 May 2009)
- Netherlands: Lt. Col. Gijs Tuinman (4 December 2014)
- Netherlands: Maj. Roy de Ruiter (31 August 2018)

== Privileges ==
Members of the Military William Order are awarded certain privileges:

- When wearing the decorations, a member must be saluted by all Dutch military personnel regardless of rank or branch.
- Once a year all members of the Order are invited to the palace by the monarch on the Ridderdag (Knights Day).
- Individual members of the Order are granted an annual pension by the Dutch state, when they receive it while holding a rank below officer.
- Individual members of the Order are granted a military funeral.
- Members of the Order are granted VIP seats during military ceremonies, the annual address of parliament by the monarch and during state funerals.

== See also ==
- List of knights grand cross of the Military Order of William
- Order of the Netherlands Lion
- Order of Orange Nassau
- Dutch Cross of Resistance
