= Gijs Tuinman =

Dutch military officer and politician (born 1979)

Gijs Tuinman RMWO
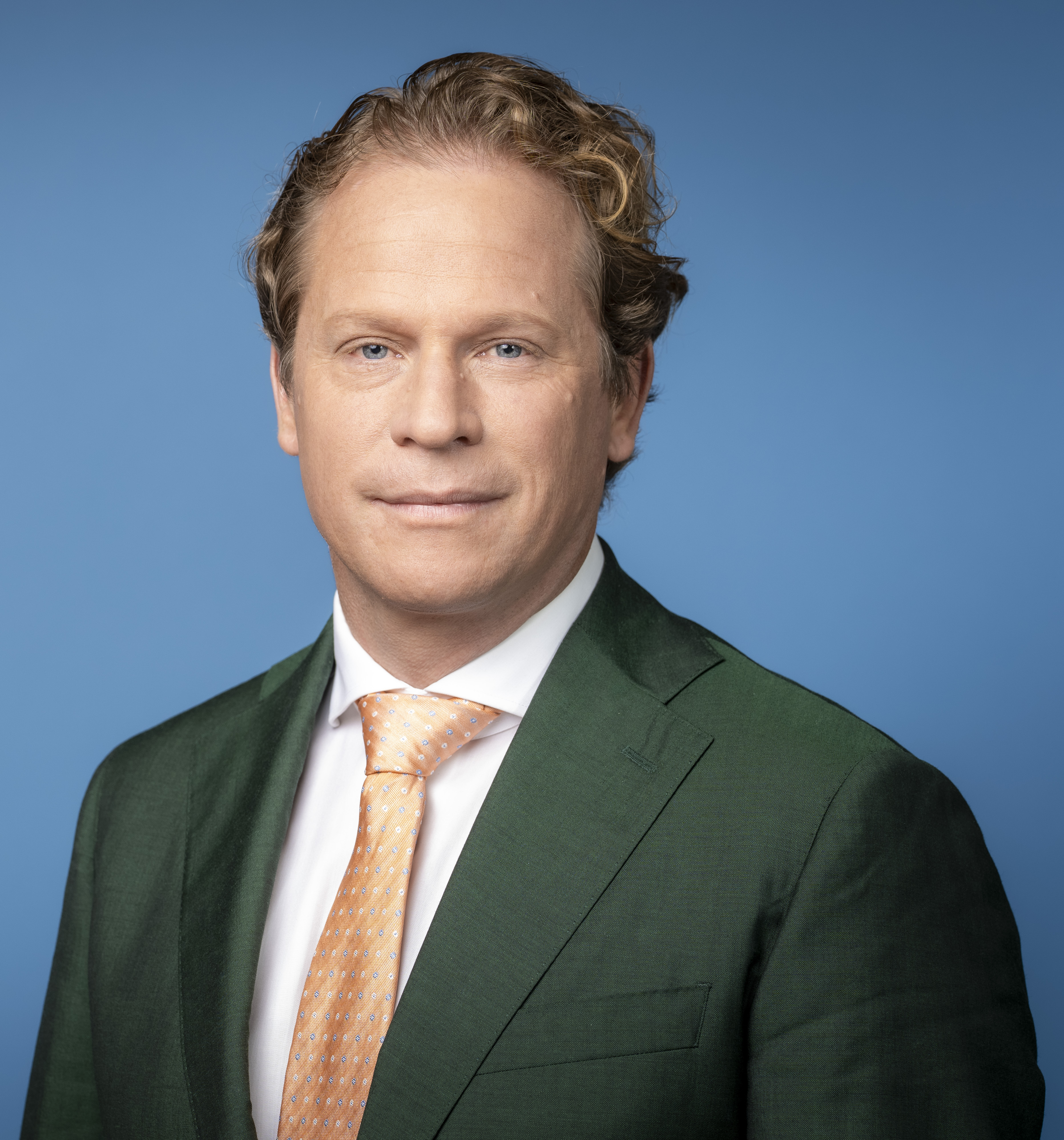
- Official portrait, 2024

State Secretary for Defence
- In office 2 July 2024 – 23 February 2026
- Prime Minister: Dick Schoof
- Minister: Ruben Brekelmans
- Preceded by: Christophe van der Maat
- Succeeded by: Derk Boswijk

Member of the House of Representatives
- In office 6 December 2023 – 2 July 2024
- Succeeded by: Marieke Wijen-Nass

Personal details
- Born: Gijs Pepijn Tuinman; 15 November 1979 (age 46) Heerlen, Netherlands
- Party: Farmer–Citizen Movement (2022–26)
- Children: 1
- Education: Koninklijke Militaire Academie; School of Advanced Military Studies; Leiden University
- Awards: Bronze Lion; Military William Order, Knight (4th class)

Military service
- Allegiance: Netherlands
- Branch/service: Royal Netherlands Army
- Years of service: 1998–2012, 2013–2023
- Rank: Lieutenant Colonel
- Unit: Korps Commandotroepen
- Battles/wars: War in Afghanistan

Gijs Pepijn Tuinman (pronounced [ˈɣɛis pəˈpɛin ˈtœymɑn]; born 15 November 1979) is a Dutch retired military officer and former politician of the Farmer–Citizen Movement (BBB), who served as State Secretary for Defence in the Schoof cabinet from July 2024 to February 2026. He was a member of the House of Representatives in the preceding seven months. Tuinman is one of the only three living knights of the Military Order of William, the oldest and highest order of chivalry of the Kingdom of the Netherlands.

== Biography ==
Gijs Tuinman was born in 1979 in Heerlen, Limburg, where he attended the Bernardinuscollege from 1992 to 1998. In 1998, he went to the Royal Military Academy in Breda. In 2001, he became a platoon commander in the Korps Commandotroepen to be. By 2009, he had been on at least five deployments to Afghanistan, several to Africa and other missions. On 7 October 2009, for a mission in 2006, he was awarded the Bronze Lion, the second highest military decoration awarded by Queen Beatrix.

From 2009 to 2012, he worked as a special operations policy advisor at the Ministry of Defence in The Hague. After this, he became a 'civilian' consultant at Deloitte. He returned to military duty in 2013.

=== Military Order of William ===
On 4 December 2014 at the Binnenhof in The Hague, Tuinman received the highest military honour of the Netherlands and was appointed a Knight (4th class) of the Military William Order (RMWO) by King Willem-Alexander, for exceptional leadership and personal bravery during multiple high‑risk operations in Afghanistan, in which he disrupted Taliban forces, secured strategically vital areas, and coordinated the rescue of a wounded soldier under fire without further losses. The King referred to Tuinman and Epke Zonderland in his Christmas speech in 2014.

=== Politics ===
He was elected to the House of Representatives in November 2023 as the third candidate of the Farmer–Citizen Movement, and he became the BBB's spokesperson for foreign affairs, trade, defense, and kingdom relations. Tuinman told in February 2024 – during the Russian invasion of Ukraine – on BNR Nieuwsradio that he believed the Netherlands should more actively support NATO's defense of Central and Eastern Europe against Russia. He suggested Dutch soldiers should be permanently stationed in Lithuania or Poland.

After the PVV, VVD, NSC, and BBB formed the Schoof cabinet, Tuinman was sworn in as State State Secretary for Defence on 2 July 2024. His portfolio includes personnel, materiel, real estate, defence industry, IT and innovation, physical and social security, and resilience. In September 2024, Tuinman and Minister Ruben Brekelmans announced €2.4 billion in increased yearly funding for the Netherlands Armed Forces. Coalition parties agreed to increase defense spending to adhere to the NATO norm of 2% of GDP in response the Russian invasion of Ukraine. Additional funding would go towards attracting more personnel and the purchase of munitions, 50 Leopard 2A8 battle tanks, six F-35 fighter jets, two Anti-Submarine Warfare Frigates, and several NH90 military helicopters. The Netherlands had been left without tanks since 2011 because of budget cuts. Tuinman later told that he aimed to increase the defense ministry's personnel from 74,000 to at least 100,000. Derk Boswijk succeeded Tuinman on 23 February 2026, when the Jetten cabinet was sworn in.

== Electoral history ==
Electoral history of Gijs Tuinman
Year	Body	Party	Pos.	Votes	Result		Ref.
Year	Body	Party	Pos.	Votes	Party seats	Individual	Ref.
2023	House of Representatives	Farmer–Citizen Movement	3	5,834	7	Won	
2025	House of Representatives	Farmer–Citizen Movement	6	3,070	4	Lost	

== Decorations ==
- Knight 4th class of the Military Order of William (RMWO)
- Bronze Lion
- Knight of the Order of Orange-Nassau
- Commemorative Medal Peacekeeping Operations
- Four Day Marches Cross
- NATO Medal

Political offices
Preceded by Christophe van der Maat	State Secretary for Defence; 2024–2026	Succeeded by Derk Boswijk
