= Marieke Wijen-Nass =

Dutch politician (born 1993)

Member of the House of Representatives
- In office 4 July 2024 – 11 November 2025
- Preceded by: Gijs Tuinman

Personal details
- Born: 10 March 1993 (age 33) Heerlen, Netherlands
- Party: Farmer–Citizen Movement (since 2023)
- Other party: Christian Democratic Appeal (until 2023)
- Occupation: Politician

Marieke Wijen-Nass (born 10 March 1993) is a Dutch politician for the Farmer–Citizen Movement, who was a member of the House of Representatives between July 2024 and November 2025. She succeeded Gijs Tuinman, who had been appointed defence state secretary in the Schoof cabinet. Her portfolio contained defense, justice, security, housing, and spatial planning.

In an October 2024 debate, Wijen-Nass expressed support for Ukraine in its defense against the Russian invasion, but she opposed Ukrainian membership of the NATO military alliance afterwards, arguing that it should serve as a buffer state.

== House committee assignments ==
- Committee for Digital Affairs (vice chair)
- Committee for Housing and Spatial Planning (vice chair)
- Committee for the Interior
- Credentials committee
- Committee for Defence
- Contact group France

== Electoral history ==
Electoral history of Marieke Wijen-Nass
Year	Body	Party	Pos.	Votes	Result		Ref.
Year	Body	Party	Pos.	Votes	Party seats	Individual	Ref.
2021	House of Representatives	Christian Democratic Appeal	30	3,962	15	Lost	
2023	House of Representatives	Farmer–Citizen Movement	11	2,744	7	Lost (Note: Wijen-Nass was appointed to the body later during the term due to a vacancy.)	
2025	House of Representatives	Farmer–Citizen Movement	7	2,763	4	Lost	

== See also ==
- List of members of the House of Representatives of the Netherlands, 2023–2025
