= CFIQ =

Radio station in Ontario, Canada

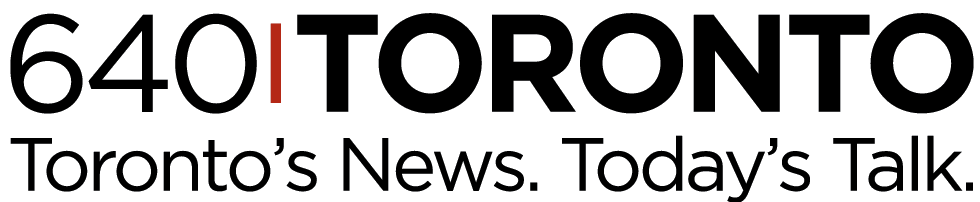
- Richmond Hill, Ontario; Canada
- Broadcast area: Greater Toronto Area; Southern Ontario
- Frequency: 640 kHz (AM)
- Branding: 640 Toronto

Programming
- Format: Talk
- Affiliations: Global News

Ownership
- Owner: Corus Radio (Corus Entertainment); (Corus Premium Television Ltd.)
- Sister stations: CFNY-FM, CILQ-FM, CING-FM, CIII-DT

History
- First air date: July 1, 1957
- Former call signs: CJRH (1957–1961); CFGM (1961–1988, 1988–1990); CHOG (1988, 1990–1999); CFYI (1999–2002); CFMJ (2002–2022)
- Former frequencies: 1300 kHz (1957–1959); 1310 kHz (1959–1978); 1320 kHz (1978–1988)

Technical information
- Licensing authority: CRTC
- Class: B
- Power: 50,000 watts
- Transmitter coordinates: 43°10′45″N 79°25′59″W
- Repeater: 95.3 CING-FM-HD2

Links
- Website: www.globalnews.ca/radio/640toronto/

CFIQ (640 AM) is a commercial radio station licensed to Richmond Hill, Ontario, and serving Greater Toronto, Southern Ontario and Western New York with a talk format known as "640 Toronto". Owned by Corus Entertainment, CFIQ's studios are located at the Corus Quay Building in Toronto; despite the station's city of licence being a suburban community north of the city, the transmitter is located at Merritt Road and north of John Street in the Niagara Region town of Lincoln, 60 kilometres (37 miles) southwest of Toronto.

== History ==
=== Early years ===
On July 1, 1957, the station first signed on as CJRH. It was a 500-watt station, broadcasting on 1300 kHz. The last two letters in the call sign referred to its city of licence, Richmond Hill. It moved to 1310 in 1959, and changed its call letters to CFGM in 1961. The station adopted a country music format in 1964. A few years later, it became Canada's first 24-hour country station. Don Daynard, who went on to become a longtime personality on CKFM and CHFI-FM, was a host on CFGM in the 1960s.

The station moved to 1320 in 1978, and to 640 kHz on September 16, 1988.

=== Top 40 era ===
Final CHOG logo

After 26 years as a country station, CFGM changed its format and call letters at 5 p.m. on June 29, 1990, broadcasting a rock-leaning Top 40/CHR format as AM 640 The Hog, CHOG (which would later shift towards a more mainstream direction in September 1991). By early 1992, the station rebranded as AM 640 The Beat of Toronto, and adjusted its format to Rhythmic CHR.

Several notable radio personalities were associated with the station during this era, including John Gallagher, "Tarzan Dan" Freeman, Pat Cochrane, Adrian Bell, Tony Monaco, Deanna Nason, Randy Taylor, Eric Hollo, Kenny 'The Hitman' Caughlin, Roger Kelly (Roger Kettyls) and the Toronto radio team of Jesse and Gene. After CFTR changed formats from contemporary hits to all-news in 1993, CHOG was the last Top 40 station in the Toronto radio market until CISS-FM adopted the format in February 1999. Talk shows would later come to take up a substantial part of the station's schedule, particularly during midday periods when many of the station's hit music listeners might normally be in school.

=== Shift to Talk ===
Talk 640 logo

On October 10, 1995, at 10 p.m., the station changed to a full-time talk format. As Talk 640, the station aired syndicated shows such as Joy Browne, Rhona Raskin, Dr. Laura and Live Audio Wrestling, along with local programming hosted by personalities such as Gene Valaitis, Jane Hawtin, Bill Carroll, Shelley Klinck, Marsha Lederman, Karen Horsman, Michael Coren, Dave Chalk, Spaceman Gary Bell and Roger Kelly(Roger Kettyls).

Despite regular adjustments, including acquiring the radio broadcast rights to the Toronto Maple Leafs, the station received low ratings. During this period, the station adopted the call letters CFYI. The weekend programming was a hit with "The Touch of Health" a show that started with just a half hour in 1997 to a two-hour nationally syndicated show airing 2 to 4 p.m. Saturdays. Hosted, produced and managed by Christine McPhee, other weekend shows were the "Pet Show" with Mitch Levitsky, a "Cruise Show", a "Law Show", a "Beauty Show", and the "Small Canada Business Show".

=== Mojo Radio ===
Mojo Radio logo used from 2001-2004

In 2000, the station was acquired by Corus Entertainment. On April 23, 2001, at 6:40 a.m., the station re-launched as Mojo Radio, a hot talk radio format aimed at the male demographic. The station also changed its call letters the same day to CFMJ.

The new format featured programs hosted by Humble and Fred, John Derringer, Mike Stafford, Andrew Krystal, Maie Pauts, Spider Jones, Rebecca Rosenblat, and the syndicated Phil Hendrie and Coast to Coast AM.

Later on, John Oakley replaced Scruff Connors, who had taken over from Humble and Fred; the latter pair left for hot adult contemporary station CKFM-FM in July 2003. Krystal moved to part-time work at CFRB and CKTB before moving to CJNI-FM in Halifax. Derringer's Mojo show was later discontinued as he concentrated on his marquee morning show on co-owned CILQ-FM.

=== AM640 Toronto Radio ===
In 2004, due to low ratings (MOJO was typically hovering around a 1.4 share), the station moved away from the male-oriented imaging to a more general news and talk format as AM640 Toronto Radio. Oakley and Stafford continued to host the major morning and afternoon drive programs. Former police union head Craig Bromell joined the station as co-host of a new late morning program, The Beat (later rebranded as Bromell! in 2006), and in 2005, Charles Adler's nationally syndicated radio show was added to mid-afternoons. Award-winning journalist Arlene Bynon was added to the ranks in 2006 to host the Saturday afternoon Toronto Weekend program, which expanded to include a Sunday edition as well.

AM640 Toronto Radio logo, used from 2004-2010

Near the end of July 2007, the programming line-up was shuffled in response to the departure of Craig Bromell, whose show ran until the end of August 2007. Afternoon host Mike Stafford replaced Bromell. The Bill Watters Show was added to the afternoon lineup. Just as the new show with co-host Jeff Marek expanded, Marek moved on to Sirius Satellite Radio. Greg Brady replaced Marek as Bill's co-host. Brady left AM640 in late June 2010 to host a Noon - 3pm program on The FAN 590. Bill Hayes, formerly of Q107, replaced Greg Brady as Watters' co-host. Hayes was fired in January 2011. Co-hosting duties then fell to his son, Bryan Hayes. Hayes left AM640 on Friday, April 8 to host his own mid-morning program on TSN Radio 1050. AM640's Leafs play-by-play colour analyst Jim Ralph became co-host of The Bill Watters Show, which ran from 4pm – 7pm covering hockey issues and other major sports news as well, up until July 15, 2011.

Veteran host and reporter John Downs was let go in early August, 2010. His 7pm - 9pm slot was then hosted by Bryan Hayes, whose program was primarily sports-talk, until April 12, 2011 when Bryan took the mid-day host slot at TSN Radio 1050. Charles Adler's 2pm - 4pm program was moved to the 7pm - 9pm slot at the end of August 2012.

Charles Adler hosted a Toronto-based hour from 1pm - 2pm during the summer of 2010. On August 30, 2010, Arlene Bynon took over hosting duties for the 1pm - 2pm hour, with news anchor Tina Trigiani guest-hosting Friday afternoons. On July 18, 2011, The Bill Watters Show was canceled and Arlene Bynon took over the 4-7pm time slot. Tina Trigiani was the host of the 1-2p slot Monday to Friday. On July 2, 2014, Trijiani's hour was taken over by host Jeff McArthur.

Jeff McArthur, former morning show host for both CFPL-FM and AM in London, Ontario, joined AM640 in late August 2012 to host weekdays 2pm - 4pm. On July 2, 2014, his show was expanded to add the 1-2pm time slot.

On January 7, 2013, Arlene Bynon's afternoon program was replaced by Bill Carroll. Arlene stayed on as cohost for the following three weeks. Her last day was January 29. She now hosts a show on "Canada Talks" Channel 167 on Sirius XM Radio. Bill Carroll hosted the 4-7pm weekday slot in Toronto in addition to his a separate show on Los Angeles talk radio station KFI (which is also at 640 on the AM dial)

One of the station's biggest draws was that it was the radio broadcaster of the Toronto Maple Leafs, which it networked into other markets. Its play-by-play announcers were Joe Bowen, Dennis Beyak, Jim Ralph and Dan Dunleavy. Dennis Beyak left in the fall of 2011 to do the play-by-play for the Winnipeg Jets on TSN regional television and on TSN Radio 1290 CFRW. AM640's 7-year contract for the rights to Toronto Maple Leafs radio broadcasts concluded before the start of the 2012-13 NHL season—Leafs broadcasts are now split between CHUM and CJCL.

CFMJ's studios were in Suite 1600 at 1 Dundas Street West in Toronto, until Corus moved all of its Toronto-based radio, television and other assets into Corus Quay upon its completion in the summer of 2010. On September 8, 2015, CFMJ began simulcasting on co-owned CING-FM's HD-2 sub-channel.

=== Global News Radio 640 Toronto ===
Global News Radio logo used from 2017-2022

CFMJ, along with several other Corus's news/talk radio stations across Canada were relaunched under the new national Global News Radio brand between November and December 2017. The new moniker matches the Global News brand which is already used for the newscasts on Global Television's owned-and-operated stations, including CFMJ's sister station, CIII-DT, which was acquired by Corus Entertainment as part of its acquisition of the Shaw Communications media unit. The official changeover to Global News Radio 640 Toronto occurred on December 1, 2017, with CFMJ maintaining its talk format and on-air roster.

=== 640 Toronto ===
The "Global News Radio" branding was dropped in January 2022 to avoid confusion between news and talk programming on the station. The station continues to have a shared newsroom with Global News and the newscasts themselves are still identified as Global News. The change occurred one month after Amanda Cupido was hired as the station's program director.

On May 1, 2022, the station's call sign was changed to CFIQ. The weekday talk show lineup included Greg Brady hosting Toronto Today in the morning drive slot followed by Kelly Cutrara, Alan Carter, Jeff McArthur, John Oakley, Alex Pierson and Ben O'Hara-Byrne, with Shane Hewitt in the overnight slot.

Effective August 8, 2022, Carter and McArthur discontinued their shows in order to focus on their duties at Global Television. Cutrata moved to early afternoons and Pierson moved from evenings to the 9 am to noon slot, following Greg Brady.

In August 2023, Amanda Cupido was replaced as program director by Mike Bendixen, who also became Corus' national director of talk programming. Bendixen had previously been program director at rival talk station CFRB for 12 years ending in 2021. Bendixen left Corus in July 2026.

As of July 2026, weekday programming includes Toronto Today with Greg Brady, No B.S. with Brad Smith, The Alex Pierson Show, The Ben Mulroney Show, Global News at 6, The Employment Law Show and The Last Show with David Cooper. Overnight programming consists largely of rebroadcasts, along with The Ongoing History of New Music. Weekend programming includes Toronto Today with Greg Brady: The Weekend Edition and Weekends with Rob Fai, as well as financial, legal, lifestyle and other specialty programs and repeats of weekday shows.

In March 2025 Brady took a leave of absence from the station as he pursues a Conservative Party of Canada nomination in the 2025 Canadian federal election, with his spot as host of Toronto Today to be filled in the interim by Kevin Frankish.

== Defunct programs ==
=== Toronto Maple Leafs hockey ===
From 1998 until 2012, the station aired radio broadcasts of Toronto Maple Leafs hockey games. Dennis Beyak was the team's play-by-play commentator when Joe Bowen called games on television, though Bowen continued to call games on radio when the Leafs aired on national TV. Beyak was replaced by Dan Dunleavy in 2011, when he left for TSN to be the Winnipeg Jets play-by-play commentator.

The station has not aired Leafs games since the 2012–13 season. All games have since been split with CJCL and CHUM, owned by Rogers and Bell, respectively. Both media companies co-own the parent company of the team.

=== The Morning Show ===
On November 7, 2016, the station launched a new morning drive show, The Morning Show, pairing National Post columnist and editor Matt Gurney with CBC contributor and lawyer Supriya Dwivedi as co-hosts, replacing the John Oakley Show, which moved to afternoon drive. In February 2018, as part of the station's "revitalization" following its rebranding as Global News Radio, Gurney was moved to the 9 am to noon slot to host The Exchange with Matt Gurney, and Mike Stafford was moved to The Morning Show with Dwivedi remaining as co-host.

On November 27, 2020, Dwivedi announced on-air that she was leaving the show and Global, filing a complaint with the Canadian Human Rights Commission alleging that the station had allowed its on-air talent and callers to spread "false narratives" about refugees, Muslims and other groups on air, unchallenged, and refused to enforce journalistic standards on talk radio resulting in her "receiving an increase in racist comments and violent threats". In her resignation letter, she stated “I can no longer be part of an ecosystem that tolerates and in some cases, actively sows division and discord... As a female, racialized journalist, I have been subject to rape threats against me and my 17-month old daughter and absolutely abhorrent statements from members of the public when I attempt to counter and correct the misinformation and false narratives promoted by other hosts and guests on the station.”

Mike Stafford remained as the show's host, with rotating guest co-hosts, until June 2021 when he was fired, after 20 years at the station, for using a racial slur in an internal company group chat while commenting that Ontario Premier Doug Ford was likely to slip up and use the slur during his press conference. Stafford had previously been briefly suspended in 2019 after making derogatory comments about South Asians and Muslims on social media.

=== Leafs Lunch ===
Jeff Marek was offered a position with Sirius Satellite Radio and CBC's Hockey Night in Canada to host a new show. On September 7, 2007 Marek announced that he was leaving Leafs Lunch on AM 640 Toronto Radio to pursue a new route in radio broadcasting on the Hockey Night in Canada radio show on Sirius Satellite Radio Channel 122. Brian Duff from the NHL Network was the program's host for a period of time until he was replaced by TSN Hockey Insider Darren Dreger. On July 5, 2010, Leafs Lunch was canceled. Leafs Lunch returned to Talk Radio AM640's Saturday and Sunday lineups, filling the noon-1p.m. timeslot until spring of 2011, when it was cancelled.

=== Tina Trigiani ===
Trigiani's show aired weekdays between 1-2p.m., this show generally covered lighter news and popular interest topics. Like the Stafford Show, a main topic was introduced and then Tina took input from listeners via e-mail and phone calls. Adding occasional colour to the show was added by Trigiani's call screener, Ryan Bonnar and technical producer Patrick Malkin. AM640 Host Jeff McArthur's show absorbed the hour in the summer of 2014.

=== Bill Carroll ===
Aired weekdays from 4-7p.m. Bill Carroll hosted the afternoon drive slot along with commentary from news anchor Sandy Salerno and producer Chris Chreston until early 2016. The opening segment of each show was known as "Carroll on the News" in which Salerno, Chreston and Carroll discussed the day's major news stories. This portion of the show was taped earlier in the day due to a conflict with Carroll's show on KFI 640 in Los Angeles. Carroll resigned from his position in Los Angeles, but soon after left AM640 in early 2016 for 580 CFRA in Ottawa.

=== The Post Game Show with Andy Frost ===
Following each Toronto Maple Leafs game, radio host and Leafs PA announcer, Andy Frost discussed the ups and downs of the night's game. Much of the broadcast involves taking phone calls from the show's audience. This show was cancelled on the station, however Frost remained an evening and weekend host on AM640's sister station Q107.

=== A View from Space ===
For over 15 years, Gary Bell (nicknamed 'The Spaceman') hosted a show, broadcast on Saturday nights, that dealt with current events, numerology and conspiracy theories . The show was cancelled, following its November 11, 2017 broadcast, when parent company Corus fired the late-night host citing complaints of antisemitic content. Bell also worked as a producer for various weekday shows during his time at the station and had previously worked as a technician at CKGM and CFTR. He died of cancer in June 2018.

=== Tasha Kheiriddin ===
Weekdays from noon–2:00p.m. Tasha Kheiriddin focused on politics and lifestyle. The show was produced by Jackie Lamport. The show featured a Political Panel every Wednesday from 1:20 - 1:40p.m. On Fridays during the same time slot a Top 3 panel took place where three women joined the show to talk about three of the top stories of the week. Notable panelists included Maddie Di Muccio, Lisa Kinsella, Anne Lagacé Dowson, and Sophie Nadaeu. The final edition of the program aired March 1, 2019 when it ended its run after three years.

=== The Exchange with Matt Gurney ===
Aired weekdays from 9a.m.-noon, The Exchange was a news based talk show with host Matt Gurney. Heather Purdon, Mike Stafford's former producer, produced the show. The show was launched in February 2018 and ended in February 2019.

=== The Shift with Shane Hewitt ===
The Shift, a national talk radio show broadcast from sister station CKNW 980 in Vancouver, aired on the station from 2018 until 2023. Initially hosted by Drex from 2018 to 2020, Shane Hewitt later hosted the show from a home studio in Airdrie, Alberta.

== Notable on-air staff and alumni ==
- Dennis Beyak, play-by-play commentator for Leafs broadcasts
- Bill Carroll
- Andy Frost
- Marty Galin and Avrum Rosensweig (Marty & Avrum Restaurant Show, 1995-1998)
- Jeff Marek
- Sam Yuchtman

== See also ==
- CKGO, a radio station in Vancouver that also used the Mojo format
- CKNW, Corus talk radio station in Vancouver, British Columbia
- CHML, Corus talk radio station in Hamilton, Ontario
- CJOB, Corus talk radio station in Winnipeg
