= Jesse and Gene =

Jesse and Gene (or The Jesse and Gene Show) is a Canadian morning zoo radio show that aired in the Toronto, Ontario, Canada radio market between 1986 and 1997. The duo of co-hosts consisted of Jesse Dylan and Gene Valaitis.

== History ==
=== Q107 ===
The show first began airing on Q107 on September 5, 1986, replacing Brother Jake Edwards in the station's morning slot.

=== 680 CFTR: move to afternoons on AM dial ===
In June 1989, the show's move to CFTR-AM, a Top-40 music station branded as "All Hits 680 CFTR", was announced. Beginning in July, the show aired live daily between 2 p.m. and 7 p.m., encompassing the afternoon drive time slot. Toronto press reported on CFTR's financial terms that lured the duo away from Q107 as being lucrative.

On June 17, 1991, Jesse and Gene became CFTR's new morning show following the retirement of longtime morning man Tom Rivers.

When CFTR changed its format to an all-news station in June 1993, re-branding as "680 News", Jesse and Gene were let go along with most of the on-air personnel.

=== AM 640 ===
The duo immediately got picked up by CHOG-AM, a station owned by Western International Communications (WIC) and operated through its subsidiary Westcom Radio Group. As announced by the company's programming vice president Danny Kingsbury, Jesse and Gene debuted in CHOG's morning slot on June 21, 1993, while the station's previous morning man Adrian Bell was moved to mid-days. Branded as "AM 640: The Beat Of Toronto", the station was a bit of a dinosaur in the Toronto market as the last remaining Top 40 station in the city and the last AM station in Greater Toronto Area to play contemporary hits. Broadcasting out of the recently built Yonge-Norton Centre office tower in the North York area of Toronto, the duo posted strong ratings right away, coming in third in the Toronto market during January 1994 with 131,000 listeners in their peak quarter-hour, behind only Andy Barrie's 285,000 on CFRB-AM and Erin Davis' 143,000 on CHFI-FM.

In 1994, the show received complaints of racism over a skit that aired on March 30, 1994 involving an impersonation of Canadian Member of Parliament Jag Bhaduria singing songs by The Beatles with altered lyrics about his politically controversial situation in a strong Indian accent. The complaints were sent to the Canadian Radio-television and Telecommunications Commission (CRTC) who later referred it to the Canadian Broadcast Standards Council (CBSC). The CBSC later found that "the spot was a parody of a particular politician, and was not abusive or discriminatory toward people of any national or ethnic origin".

The duo got a small alley named after them in May 1994. Located in North York, then a city within Metropolitan Toronto, Jesse and Gene Way runs parallel to Yonge Street from Norton Avenue until Church Avenue.

On July 19, 1995, in preparation for an upcoming format switch, AM 640 announced cancellation of Jesse and Gene with Jesse Dylan saying his goodbyes on air. Gene Valaitis stayed on at the station, getting paired with Jane Hawtin for a new show in the 5:30 to 9 a.m. slot starting after Labour Day 1995 as AM 640 changed its format to full-time talk radio, becoming "Talk 640" in October 1995, including a call letter change from CHOG to CFYI.

=== Return to Q107 ===
Jesse and Gene reunited in July 1996 as the returning hosts of Q107's morning show. For Gene Valaitis, the reunion meant getting internally re-assigned from CFYI-AM to Q107 (both stations were owned by the same corporate entity, Western International Communications, at the time) thus breaking up his ten-month morning pairing with Jane Hawtin.

Less than a year after bringing them back, Q107 released Jesse and Gene with their last show airing on May 5, 1997, marking the end of their radio careers together. Rory O'Shea took over the morning slot on a temporary basis. Following a three month search for a permanent replacement, Q107's management decided to start simulcasting The Howard Stern Show beginning September 2, 1997.

During their broadcast tenure, they released compilation albums that featured classic skits and prank phone calls from their shows, their last one entitled Jesse and Gene: Greatest Bits.

Currently, Dylan is the host of a syndicated radio show called The Good Life Show based in Vancouver, British Columbia. Valaitis lives in Los Angeles, California.

Jesse and Gene re-united for a three-night appearance on CFRB from November 11–13, 2009, filling in for Ryan Doyle from 7:00 pm to 10:00 pm.

In February 2020, Jesse and Gene launched a brand new podcast, "Jesse and Gene Podkast".

January 2023. The Jesse and Gene Podcast releases New and Classic episodes daily. The Jesse and Gene audio library consists of hundreds of hours of classic material from the 80s and 90s that is being released on their podcast feed.
