= CHFI =

CHFI may refer to:

- CHFI-FM, a radio station (98.1 FM) licensed to Toronto, Ontario, Canada
- CFTR (AM), a radio station (680 AM) licensed to Toronto, Ontario, Canada, which held the call sign CHFI from 1962 to 1971
