= Arlene Bynon =

Canadian television and radio broadcaster

Arlene Bynon is a Canadian television and radio broadcaster, formerly an afternoon talk radio host on AM 640 in Toronto, Ontario. She has also cohosted an international talk radio show with American broadcaster John LeBoutillier.

Prior to joining AM 640, Bynon hosted an eponymous daytime talk show on Global from 1990 to 2001. Previously, after working at CJRN in Niagara Falls in the 1970s, she was a news broadcaster and host on CFTR-AM and CHFI-FM in the 1980s and 1990s hosting newsmagazines Sunday, Sunday and then Chronicle.

Her last show on AM 640 was on January 29, 2013. She currently hosts The Arlene Bynon Show on SiriusXM Canada's Canada Talks channel.
