= Morgan Frost =

Canadian ice hockey player (born 1999)

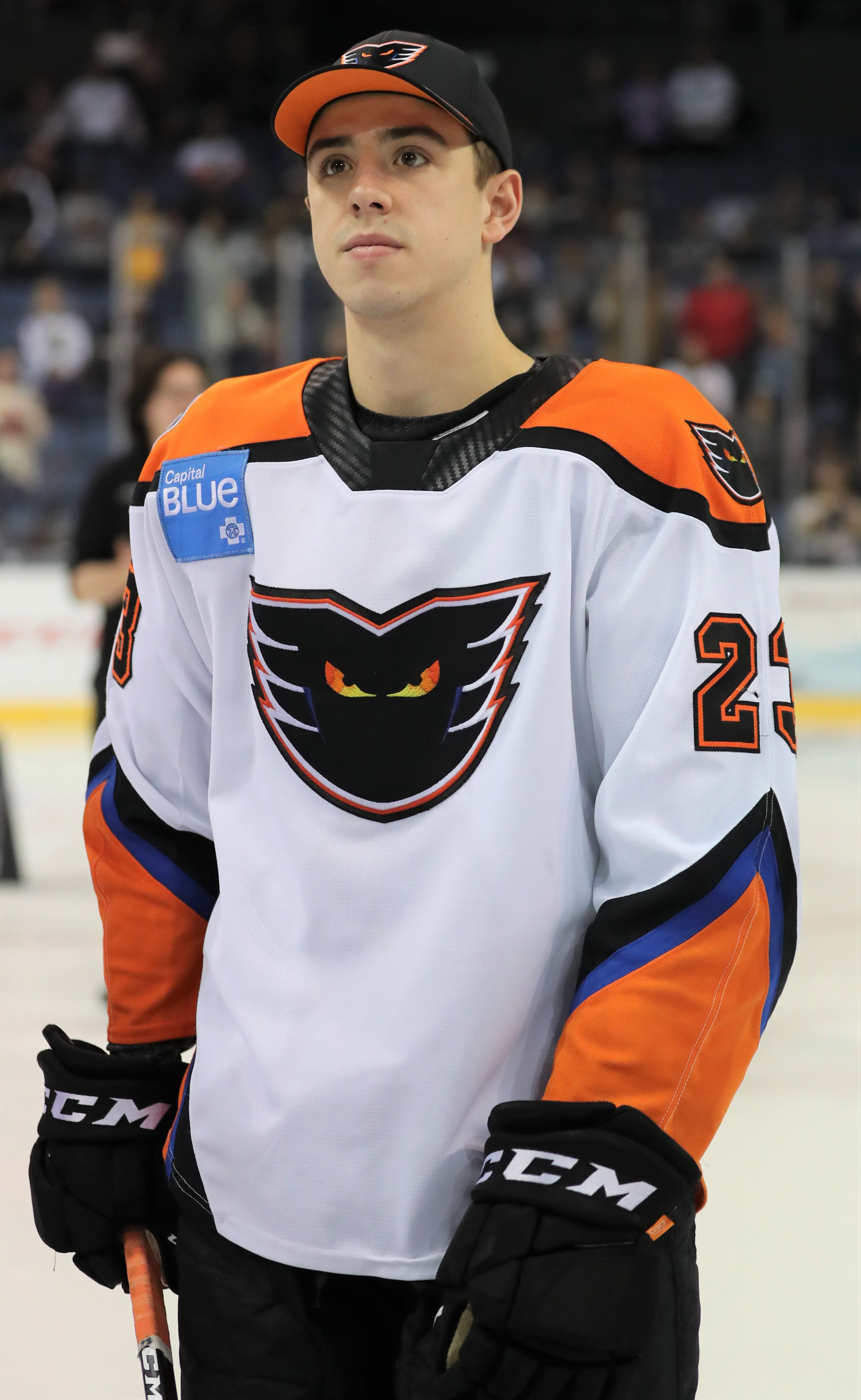
- Frost with the Lehigh Valley Phantoms in 2020
- Born: May 14, 1999 (age 27) Aurora, Ontario, Canada
- Height: 5 ft 11 in (180 cm)
- Weight: 193 lb (88 kg; 13 st 11 lb)
- Position: Centre
- Shoots: Left
- NHL team Former teams: Calgary Flames; Philadelphia Flyers
- NHL draft: 27th overall, 2017; Philadelphia Flyers
- Playing career: 2019–present

Morgan Frost (born May 14, 1999) is a Canadian professional ice hockey player who is a centre for the Calgary Flames of the National Hockey League (NHL). Frost was drafted in the first round, 27th overall, by the Philadelphia Flyers in the 2017 NHL entry draft.

Growing up, Frost would accompany his father Andy, and sister Marley to Toronto Maple Leafs games, where he developed a passion for hockey. When he was 13 years old, Frost was cut from his local minor ice hockey team due to his size, but a coach for the Barrie Jr. Colts of the Eastern AAA Hockey League took him on for two seasons. Frost was then selected by the Sault Ste. Marie Greyhounds of the Ontario Hockey League, and had an opportunity to play with the team as a 16-year-old when Jared McCann joined the NHL, creating a vacancy on the team. Frost struggled as a rookie with his focus on goal-scoring, but soon developed into a two-way forward at the instruction of his coach Drew Bannister. This culminated in two consecutive seasons of Frost scoring 100 or more points, as well as an appearance for Canada at the 2019 World Junior Ice Hockey Championships.

The Flyers traded forward Brayden Schenn in exchange for the draft selection that went to Frost, and he signed a contract with the team in August 2017. A groin injury affected Frost's performance during training camp, and he was assigned to the Phantoms to start the 2019–20 season. He was successful in Lehigh, scoring 13 goals and 29 points in 41 games, but struggled during his NHL call-up. He began the 2020–21 NHL season as a bench player for the Flyers, but his opportunity to fill in for an injured Sean Couturier was derailed by a season-ending shoulder injury.

== Early life ==
Frost was born on May 14, 1999, in Aurora, Ontario. His mother Dana works as a personal trainer and operates a yoga and cycle studio in Aurora. His father Andy, meanwhile, served as the public address announcer for the Toronto Maple Leafs of the National Hockey League (NHL) from 1999 to 2016. Frost began accompanying his father to hockey games around the age of five, and he started taking notes on the game when he was 12 or 13 years old. Despite watching what his father described as "a lot of mediocre and bad hockey teams" playing at the Air Canada Centre, Frost was an avid Maple Leafs fan, with his favourite player being centre Kyle Wellwood.

When Frost was 13 years old, he was physically smaller and less aggressive than many of his teammates, which led to his being cut from the elite 'AAA'-level minor ice hockey team in the region, the York–Simcoe Bantams. Disillusioned by the experience, Frost returned to the 'AA' minor hockey level, where he was noticed by John MacArthur, coach of the AAA Barrie Jr. Colts of the Eastern AAA Hockey League (ETA). MacArthur helped release Frost from the York–Simcoe system, and he spent the next two seasons in Barrie. During the 2014–15 minor hockey season, Frost contributed 30 goals and 55 points over 30 games.

== Playing career ==
=== Junior ===
The Sault Ste. Marie Greyhounds of the Ontario Hockey League (OHL) selected Frost in the fourth round, 81st overall, of the 2015 OHL Priority Selection draft. Frost did not expect to begin playing with the team that season, but when the Vancouver Canucks elected to keep Jared McCann, the Greyhounds were left without a centre, and they signed Frost to take McCann's place. During his first season of junior ice hockey, Frost was solely focused on scoring goals, and coach Drew Bannister spent Frost's rookie season focusing on turning him into a two-way forward. As a rookie during the 2015–16 OHL season, Frost posted seven goals and 20 assists in 65 games. The following year, he recorded 20 goals and 42 assists in 67 games, as well as eight points in 11 playoff games. Most of that time was spent playing on the same line as Zachary Senyshyn; with Senyshyn, Frost learned to become a playmaker, setting up scoring opportunities for his teammate.

The Greyhounds opened the 2017–18 OHL season on a 20-game winning streak, with Frost averaging two points per game. In addition to serving as the Greyhounds' top-line centre, Frost was on both the power play and penalty kill squads, posting 42 goals, 112 points, and a +70 plus–minus during the regular season. Frost was disappointed in his own playoff performance, however: he scored 10 goals and 19 assists in 24 games, but had a −4 plus–minus, and the Greyhounds were defeated in the finals by the Hamilton Bulldogs. At the end of the season, Frost received both the Greyhounds' Top Scorer Award, as well as the Rock 101 Trophy, given to the regular season most valuable player (MVP). He was also a finalist for the Red Tilson Trophy, given to the most outstanding player in the OHL.

After attending training camp with the team, the Philadelphia Flyers of the NHL sent Frost back to Sault Ste. Marie for the 2018–19 OHL season to further develop his defensive abilities. He posted a second consecutive season of over 100 points, posting 37 goals and 71 assists in 57 games, and likely would have captured the OHL scoring title had he not served a three-game suspension for cross-checking Nick Grima of the Sarnia Sting. Frost was also the first OHL skater to record 100 points in the 2018–19 season, doing so with two assists in a game against the Kitchener Rangers on February 22, 2019. The first assist in that game was also Frost's 300th career OHL point. During the final series of his junior hockey career, Frost suffered a torn glenoid labrum in Game 4 of a playoff series against the Saginaw Spirit. He played through the series, registering three assists in the elimination game, but Saginaw ultimately took the series in six games. In 257 career games with the Greyhounds, Frost produced 106 goals and 204 assists.

=== Professional ===
==== Philadelphia Flyers (2019–2025) ====
Heading into the 2017 NHL entry draft, the NHL Central Scouting Bureau ranked Frost the 31st-highest prospect out of all North American skaters. Prior to the draft, the Flyers traded forward Brayden Schenn to the St. Louis Blues in exchange for the 27th overall draft pick, a selection which they used on Frost. Speaking about the decision, then-general manager Ron Hextall said, "There are very few guys where our whole staff likes the guy, and our whole staff liked this guy. He's an extremely intelligent player and reads the ice well. Good two-way player who showed up good in the testing." Frost signed a three-year, entry-level contract with the Flyers on August 3, 2017.

After a groin injury limited Frost's performance during the Flyers' training camp, he was assigned to the Lehigh Valley Phantoms, Philadelphia's American Hockey League (AHL) affiliate, to begin the 2019–20 season. Through his first 16 games there, Frost put up five goals and seven assists. The Flyers, meanwhile, entered a slump that forced coach Alain Vigneault to alter his offensive lines, and Frost was called up to the NHL on November 18, 2019, to centre a line with Travis Konecny and Claude Giroux. Frost made his NHL debut the next day, picking up his first career goal in a 5–2 loss against the Florida Panthers. After only two games, however, Frost entered a 16-game drought during which his only points were four assists, and he was sent back to Lehigh on December 29 to clear room on the roster for Michael Raffl, who was coming off of the injured list. Shortly afterwards, Frost received an invitation to the 2020 AHL All-Star Classic as the only representative for the Phantoms. Frost played a total of 41 games with the Phantoms, recording 13 goals and 29 points in the process, before the AHL season was suspended and ultimately cancelled due to the COVID-19 pandemic. Although Frost travelled with the Flyers to Toronto for the 2020 Stanley Cup playoffs, he did not appear in a game.

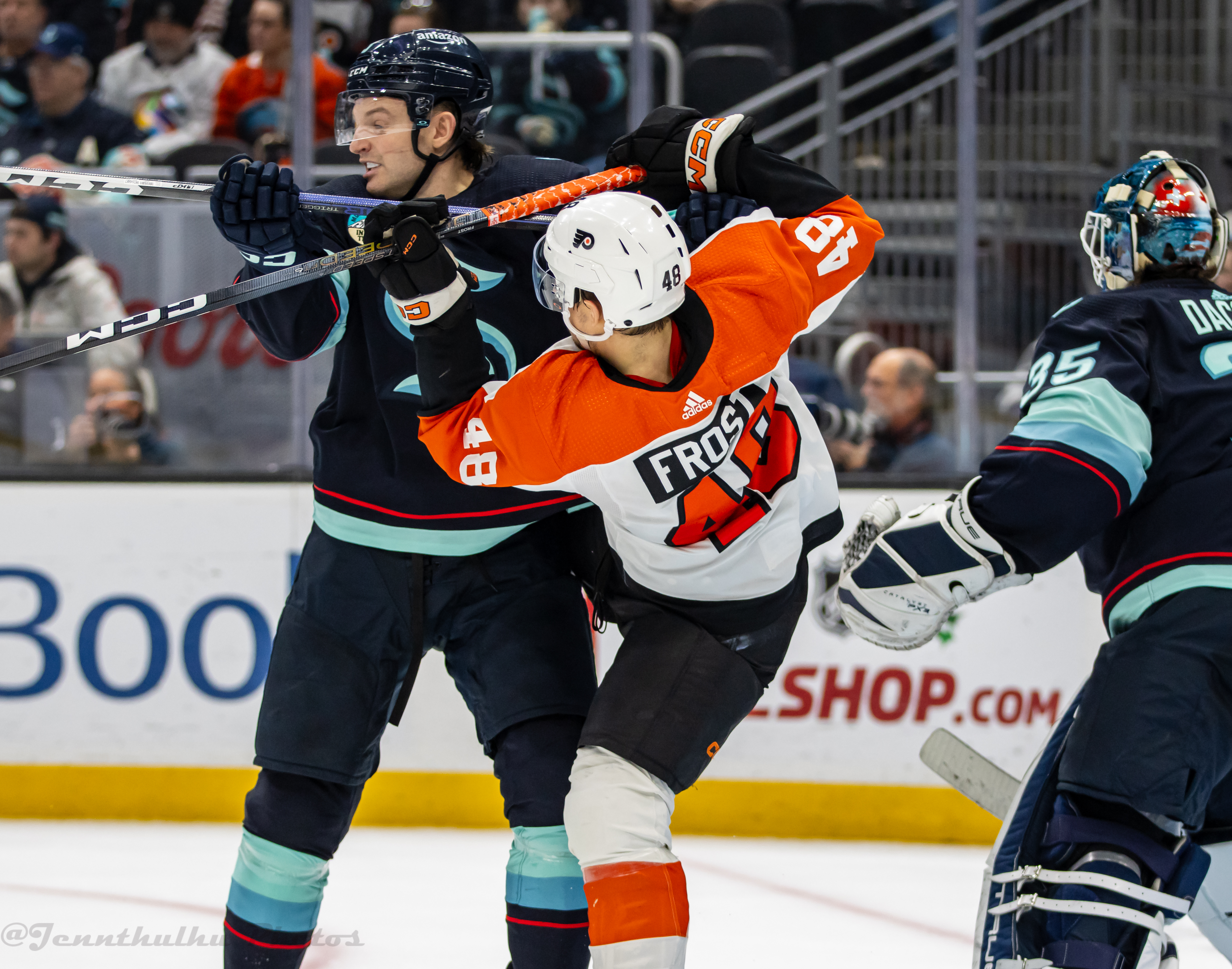
Frost battles for position with Will Borgen of the Seattle Kraken in front of the net in 2023.

Frost started the 2020–21 NHL season as a bench player for the Flyers, but received an opportunity to occupy Sean Couturier's spot as the top line centre when Couturier suffered a rib injury in the second game of the season. Vigneault chose to promote Frost to the top line, which featured Travis Konecny and Oskar Lindblom on the wings, both to give Frost an opportunity to display his proficiency and to avoid disrupting the chemistry of the other three established offensive lines. Two days later, however, a hit from Jake McCabe of the Buffalo Sabres caused Frost to leave with a dislocated left shoulder. On February 2, the Flyers announced that Frost would be undergoing season-ending shoulder surgery in Vail, Colorado. He played in only two games that season.

Frost spent the 2021 offseason rehabilitating his shoulder injury, first at the Flyers' training facility in Voorhees Township, New Jersey and later at home in Aurora, with the hope that he would make the Flyers roster out of training camp. On October 6, however, Frost was one of several skaters sent to the Phantoms in a round of preseason roster cuts. He scored 15 points in the first 16 games of the Phantoms' season before being called up to the Flyers on November 24 to fill a roster that had been hindered by injuries to Kevin Hayes and Derick Brassard.

==== Calgary Flames (2025–present) ====
During the 2024–25 season, his sixth with the Flyers, Frost was traded along with Joel Farabee to the Calgary Flames in exchange for Andrei Kuzmenko, Jakob Pelletier and two draft picks on January 30, 2025.

== International play ==
After being overlooked in 2018, Frost was selected to play for Canada at the 2019 World Junior Ice Hockey Championships. He recorded a hat-trick, as well as two assists, in Canada's 14–0 win over Denmark in the preliminary rounds, and was named the Player of the Game. During the tournament, Frost played on the wing rather than at his usual centre position, and he recorded four goals and four assists in five games.

== Career statistics ==
=== Regular season and playoffs ===
			Regular season					Playoffs
Season	Team	League	GP	G	A	Pts	PIM	GP	G	A	Pts	PIM
2015–16	Sault Ste. Marie Greyhounds	OHL	65	7	20	27	12	12	1	2	3	0
2016–17	Sault Ste. Marie Greyhounds	OHL	67	20	42	62	36	11	2	6	8	4
2017–18	Sault Ste. Marie Greyhounds	OHL	67	42	70	112	56	22	10	17	27	26
2018–19	Sault Ste. Marie Greyhounds	OHL	58	37	72	109	45	11	7	11	18	4
2019–20	Lehigh Valley Phantoms	AHL	41	13	16	29	20	—	—	—	—	—
2019–20	Philadelphia Flyers	NHL	20	2	5	7	4	—	—	—	—	—
2020–21	Philadelphia Flyers	NHL	2	0	0	0	0	—	—	—	—	—
2021–22	Lehigh Valley Phantoms	AHL	24	6	13	19	8	—	—	—	—	—
2021–22	Philadelphia Flyers	NHL	55	5	11	16	14	—	—	—	—	—
2022–23	Philadelphia Flyers	NHL	81	19	27	46	24	—	—	—	—	—
2023–24	Philadelphia Flyers	NHL	71	13	28	41	22	—	—	—	—	—
2024–25	Philadelphia Flyers	NHL	49	14	11	25	16	—	—	—	—	—
2024–25	Calgary Flames	NHL	32	3	9	12	6	—	—	—	—	—
2025–26	Calgary Flames	NHL	82	22	21	43	28	—	—	—	—	—
NHL totals			392	75	115	190	114	—	—	—	—	—

=== International ===
Year	Team	Event	Result	GP	G	A	Pts	PIM
2019	Canada	WJC	6th	5	4	4	8	12
Junior totals				5	4	4	8	12

== Awards and honours ==
Award	Year	Ref
OHL
Sault Ste. Marie Greyhounds Top Scorer Award	2018	
Sault Ste. Marie Greyhounds Rock 101 Trophy	2018	
AHL
All-Star Classic	2020	

Awards and achievements
Preceded by Nolan Patrick	Philadelphia Flyers first-round draft pick 2017	Succeeded by Joel Farabee
