= CILQ-FM =

Radio station in Toronto

Coordinates: 43°38′33″N 79°23′14″W

- Toronto, Ontario; Canada
- Broadcast area: Greater Toronto Area
- Frequency: 107.1 MHz
- Branding: Q107

Programming
- Format: Mainstream rock

Ownership
- Owner: Corus Entertainment; (Corus Premium Television Ltd.)
- Sister stations: CFIQ, CFNY-FM, CIII-DT

History
- First air date: May 22, 1977
- Call sign meaning: derived from the word "silk"

Technical information
- Licensing authority: CRTC
- Class: C1
- ERP: 36,180 watts
- HAAT: 449 metres (1,473 ft)

Links
- Webcast: Listen live
- Website: q107.com

CILQ-FM (107.1 FM) is a commercial radio station in Toronto, Ontario, Canada, known as Q107. The station broadcasts a mainstream rock format and is owned by Corus Entertainment. CILQ's studios are in the Corus Quay building on Dockside Drive at Toronto's Harbourfront neighbourhood.

CILQ-FM has an effective radiated power (ERP) of 36,180 watts. The transmitter is atop the CN Tower, with backup facilities at First Canadian Place. CILQ is also available through streaming audio, and is simulcast on Shaw Direct channel 864.

== History ==
CILQ signed on the air at 9 a.m. on May 22, 1977. The first song played on the station was "Hard Rock Town" by Murray McLauchlan, although the station officially signed on with Deodato's "Also Sprach Zarathustra".

CILQ debuted playing album rock, part of the numerous "Superstars" formatted stations developed by programme consultant Lee Abrams, heard in many large U.S. radio markets. The playlist consisted of about 1,000 songs, in a revolving card category system based on media sales data. Platinum albums were category B1 or B2. Older titles were D1 or D2. Canadian content was another category. Most of the music library was locked and not accessible to anyone except the program director, the music director and their assistants. Disc jockeys would pull only approved albums from a shelf in the control room. This contrasted with free form, progressive rock stations of that era, where the DJs chose their own music.

Q107 Classic rock logo

The original lineup of announcers was John Rode in mornings, Murray Smith in late mornings, Program Director Dave Charles in early afternoons, John Donabie in afternoon drive time, Mary-Ann Carpentier in evenings and Scott Marwood at nights. At 2 a.m., Marwood featured "Odds & Ends," a full album played in its entirety from his personal collection.

CILQ's original owner was CFGM Broadcasting, a division of J. Allan Slaight's Slaight Communications. The station was acquired by Western International Communications in 1985 when Slaight bought Standard Broadcasting, and became part of Corus Entertainment in 2000 when WIC's assets were divided between Corus and Canwest Global.

In the 1990s, CILQ was a mainstream rock station. It switched to a classic rock format on September 1, 2000. On April 7, 2014, the station returned to a mainstream rock sound and adopted a new slogan: "Toronto's Rock Station".

== Programming ==
Notable personalities associated with the station have included: Byrd (now with WDRV in Chicago), John Donabie, the duo of Jesse Dylan and Gene Valaitis, Scruff Connors, Kristy Knight, Joey Vendetta, Brother Jake Edwards, Jane Hawtin, Earl McCrae, John Derringer, Fearless Fred , Bill Carroll, Maureen Holloway, Andy Frost, Bob "Iceman" Segarini, Lee "Beef" Eckley, Rory O'Shea, Jonny "Gonzo" Mark, Joanne Wilder, Howard "The Hungryman" Cogan, Steve Anthony, Dusty Shannon, Alice Cooper, legendary Canadian rocker Kim Mitchell, with Al Joynes and Jennifer Valentyne.

Psychedelic Psunday was a program that aired every Sunday from 9a.m. to 9p.m. on CILQ-FM from 1985 to 2018. The program consisted entirely of music from the psychedelic era, spanning from 1965 to 1975.

In September 1997, CILQ, along with CHOM-FM in Montreal, became the first Canadian radio stations to air The Howard Stern Show, syndicated from New York City. Stern was heard on Q107 for four years, ending his run in November 2001.

On August 10, 2005, the station sparked controversy when it aired a recording of a Rolling Stones concert from 2002. The Stones were appearing in concert in Toronto the same evening, and many listeners had interpreted advance promotion for the broadcast as implying that CILQ would in fact be airing live from that evening's concert. Although he denied that the station intended to give that impression, station manager JJ Johnston apologized to listeners two days later.

In early 2009, the station introduced Nights with Alice Cooper, airing from 9p.m. to 2a.m. Sunday. Jeff Woods hosts a show called Records and Rockstars to give listeners the background stories to some of their favourite music.

In 2022, CILQ suspended and then "parted ways" with long-time morning host John Derringer over allegations that he had bullied other members of staff for years.
