= Paul Morris (announcer) =

Canadian public address announcer (1938–2025)

- Born: June 20, 1938; Toronto, Ontario, Canada
- Died: February 6, 2025 (aged 86); Oshawa, Ontario, Canada
- Occupation: Public address announcer
- Years active: 1961–1999

Paul Douglas Morris (June 20, 1938 – February 6, 2025) was a Canadian public address announcer for the Toronto Maple Leafs and sound engineer at Maple Leaf Gardens. He held the announcing job for 38 seasons, from October 14, 1961 to May 31, 1999 and was the PA announcer for 1,585 consecutive Leaf games. Morris was known for his dispassionate, monotone voice, instantly recognizable to two generations of Leaf fans.

== Life and career ==
Morris was born on June 20, 1938. His father, Doug Morris, was an electrician at Maple Leaf Gardens from its opening in 1931. Paul Morris began working at the Gardens in the summer of 1958 while a student at the Ryerson Institute of Technology. He quit school and stayed at the Gardens, becoming PA announcer three years later when Red Barber was fired. Barber had been the team's PA announcer from 1931 until 1961. He was fired after mistakenly introducing Lester B. Pearson, who was dropping the puck during a game's opening ceremony, as "Lister Beer Pearson".

During his tenure at the Gardens, Morris, along with Bob Wood, designed and assembled the modern four-sided scoreboard that was used between 1966 and 1982.

When the team moved from the Gardens to the Air Canada Centre in February 1999, Morris was not given a full-time job at the new building. Instead, he was offered $300 a game to continue as announcer. He finished the season and then retired at age 61. Andy Frost was hired as his successor in September.

At the Leafs' 1999–2000 home-opener on October 4, 1999, Morris was honoured during a pre-game ceremony and in the third period announced "last minute of play in this period" one last time. Since then Morris’s "last minute of play" is played on occasion at Leafs home games. He is considered the standard by which most PA announcers are judged and has been widely known as the most memorable of his position.

Morris died on February 6, 2025, at the age of 86.
