= Maureen Holloway =

Canadian radio personality

- Born: circa 1959 <https://www.womenofillrepute.com/brittlestar/><Maureen Holloway 22:45 .... I mean, I, I give Wendy a hard time, but she's two years older than me. [Wendy Mesley's date of birth is January 8, 1959 per Wendy Mesley>]
- Notable work: eNow; Canada AM; The Dish Show; Flick; The Last Word
- Spouse: John

Comedy career
- Medium: Television; Radio; Internet
- Genres: Topical comedy Political satire Observational comedy Wit; Word play

Maureen Holloway is a Canadian radio personality, entertainer and comedian who is best known for her radio segments The Last Word. Until September 1, 2014, Holloway used to broadcast live, weekday mornings, in consecutive segments with the hosts of Canadian morning shows in various cities.

From January 9, 2017 until October 1, 2021, Holloway co-hosted the morning show on CHFI-FM in Toronto.

== Personal life ==
Holloway is the mother of two sons named Aidan and Ronan. In 2009, she completed a master's degree in culture and communication at Ryerson University. She is the sister of the political activist and entrepreneur Kate Holloway. As a breast cancer survivor, she frequently speaks openly and positively about her life experiences after being diagnosed with a rare form of breast cancer in 2005. After completing treatments, she is now cancer free.

== Career ==
=== Radio ===
Holloway has had an over thirty-year career in radio, starting as a boat and traffic reporter for CKFM-FM in Toronto. She later became the host of the daily spoken word program Entertainment Toronto, and then an afternoon and then morning co-host on CKFM. In 2000, she left CKFM for Corus Entertainment, and began hosting her well-known nationally broadcast, The Last Word radio segments, where she would read Hollywood gossip and entertainment news from the Internet. These were broadcast live on weekday mornings in consecutive segments across Canada. During her segment, she was featured with hosts of some of Canada's biggest morning shows. These stations included:

- Halifax - B.J. and the Q Morning Crew on Q104
- Montreal- Q-Mornings with Aaron Rand on 925 the Q
- Toronto - Derringer In The Morning on Q107
- Hamilton - The Ben & Kerry Show at Y108
- Woodstock - McArthur In The Morning on 1039 FM
- Winnipeg - Morning show on Power 97
- Winnipeg - Hal Anderson in the morning on CJOB-68
- Edmonton - Dani Rohs and Pat Staron at 92.5 Fresh FM
- Calgary - Q107
- Vancouver - Brother Jake at Rock 101

Because of spending more time as a co-host with Derringer in the Morning, Holloway announced that The Last Word would cease syndication and move to a Toronto-only feature in September 2014. After the departure of Kim Mitchell from afternoons on Q107 in Toronto in fall 2015, Holloway left the morning drivetime show and moved to Mitchell's former time slot to begin hosting The Mo Show. In November 2016, Holloway announced her departure from the station, and later announced that she would be replacing Erin Davis on the morning show on CHFI-FM in January 2017.

=== Television ===
Holloway has also made appearances on television including hosting the Gemini-nominated The Dish Show on The Comedy Network. She has also reviewed video releases for Flick on the Life Network and provided gossip segments to the Canada AM and eNow programs.

=== Internet ===
In addition to her radio work, she writes a weekday blog that appears on her radio stations' web sites that is called "More Mo". The blog entries are a whimsical look at events that happen to her in her daily life with an emphasis on humour and exaggeration.

== Charity work, awards and honours ==
Holloway is also known for her charity work. She was honorary chair of "The Longest Lunch", an event to raise money for the Breast Centre at Women's College Hospital. She was the master of ceremonies at the St. Michael's Hospital Foundation's "Urban Angel Golf Classic" that helps raise money for patient, trauma and critical care. She is also involved with "Get Wiggy With It", a program that raises money for the Wig Salon Patient Assistance Fund, at The Princess Margaret Hospital Foundation to help cancer patients cope with hair loss while undergoing treatment.

For several years, Holloway participated in the Princess Margaret Ride to Conquer Cancer, a two-day, a bicycle ride of over 200 kilometres (120 mi) between Toronto and Niagara Falls. Along with her family and friends, she raised the profile of the event and also raised tens of thousands of dollars in funds for cancer research. The Ride to Conquer Cancer benefiting Princess Margaret is Canada's single largest sporting fundraiser.

In 2006, she won the Canadian Association of Broadcasters Gold Ribbon Award for Humour.
