= CFTR (AM) =

News radio station in Toronto, Ontario, Canada

- Toronto, Ontario; Canada
- Broadcast area: Greater Toronto Area
- Frequency: 680 kHz
- Branding: 680 NewsRadio Toronto

Programming
- Language: English
- Format: All-news radio
- Affiliations: Canadian Press; ABC News Radio; Bloomberg Radio; CITY-DT

Ownership
- Owner: Rogers Radio; (Rogers Media Inc.)
- Sister stations: CHFI-FM; CJCL; CKIS-FM; CFMT-DT; CITY-DT; CJMT-DT

History
- First air date: August 8, 1962
- Former call signs: CHFI (1962–1971)
- Former frequencies: 1540 kHz (1962–1966)
- Call sign meaning: Canada's First, Ted Rogers

Technical information
- Licensing authority: CRTC
- Class: B
- Power: 50,000 watts
- Transmitter coordinates: 43°12′51″N 79°36′31″W
- Repeater: 92.5 CKIS-FM HD2 (Toronto)

Links
- Webcast: Listen live
- Website: toronto.citynews.ca/audio/

CFTR (680 AM) is a commercial radio station licensed to Toronto, Ontario, Canada, serving the Greater Toronto Area with an all-news format as “680 NewsRadio Toronto”. It is owned by Rogers Radio, a division of the Rogers Sports & Media subsidiary of Rogers Communications.

CFTR's studios and offices are located in the Rogers Building at 1 Ted Rogers Way (also known as 1 Mount Pleasant Road) in Toronto, while the station transmitter is located on the southern edge of Lake Ontario at Oakes and Winston Road (near the QEW and Casablanca Blvd) in nearby Grimsby. In addition to a standard analog transmission, CFTR is simulcast on the second HD digital subchannel of CKIS-FM, and is available online and on Bell Satellite TV channel 958.

The station has been owned by Rogers Radio since its launch as CHFI in 1962. Becoming CFTR in 1971, it adopted a Top 40 format the following year, which it maintained throughout the 1970s and 1980s to high ratings. CFTR was among the last of the Top 40 stations on the AM dial to leave the format, doing so in 1993 in favor of all-news. Dubbed "680 News", it became Canada's first solo station to broadcast all-news following the closure of the CKO network, and has since been replicated in major markets across the country. From 2021 to 2024, CFTR branded as "CityNews 680", named after the CityNews service of Citytv, which Rogers acquired in 2007.

== History ==
=== Early years ===
The station launched on August 8, 1962. Its original frequency was 1540 kHz, using the call sign CHFI, simulcasting the beautiful music of sister station CHFI-FM, one of Canada's first FM radio stations. Because 1540 is a clear-channel frequency assigned to stations in the United States and the Bahamas, CHFI was authorized to broadcast only during the daytime. In 1963, it sought to pay CHLO in St. Thomas, Ontario to move from 680 to another frequency, to free up 680 for CHFI's use. No deal was finalized, but, by 1966, the stations reached an agreement to share 680, and CHFI moved to 24-hour operation at that frequency.

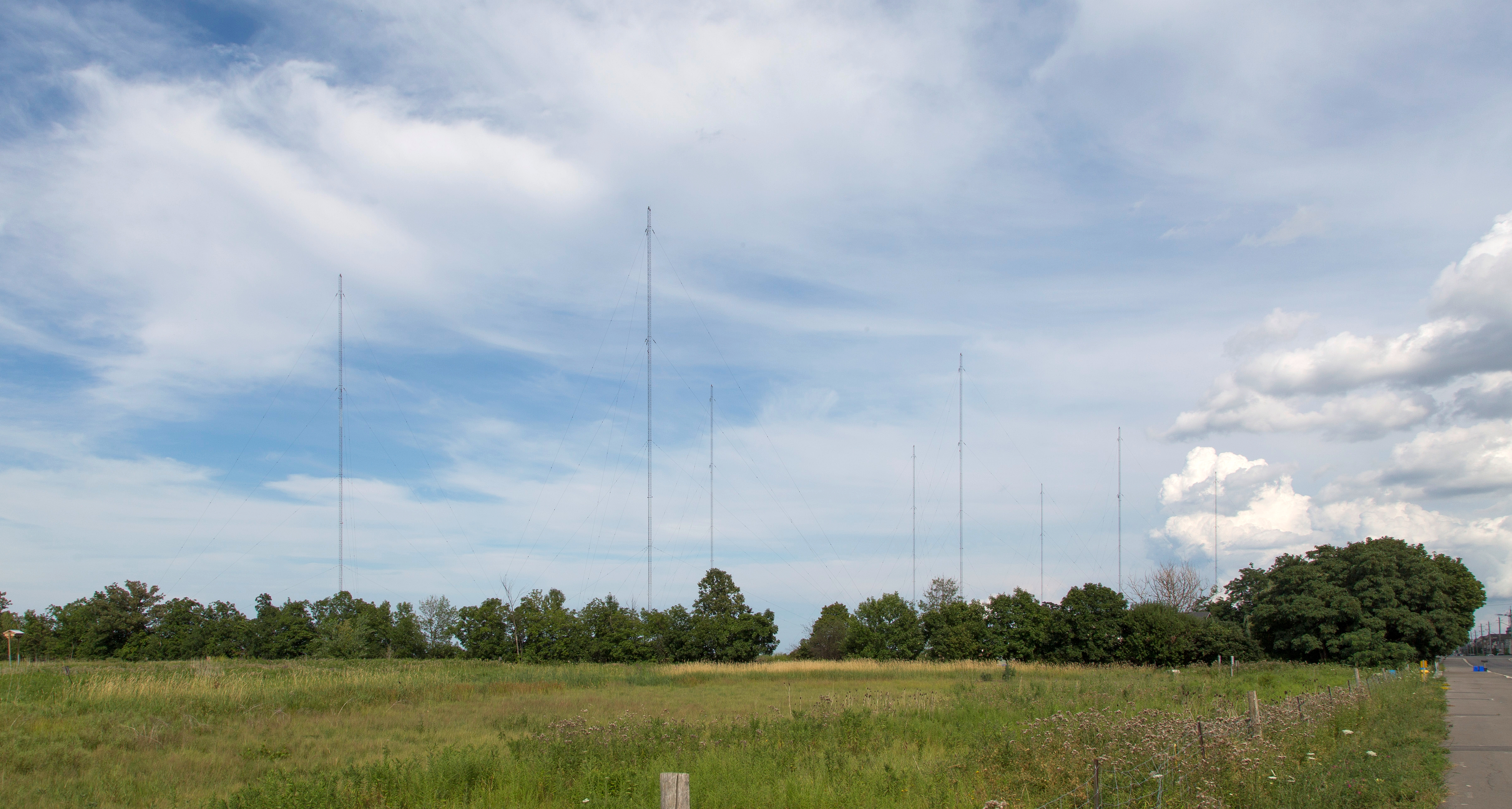
Broadcast towers in Grimsby, Ontario

In 1971, so as to distinguish itself from CHFI-FM, the station changed its callsign to CFTR; the "TR" being a tribute to Ted Rogers, Sr., radio pioneer and father of controlling shareholder Ted Rogers.

In 1972, CFTR abandoned the beautiful music simulcast of CHFI and adopted a Top 40 format. For many years, it was the primary competition to Toronto's original Top 40 station, CHUM.

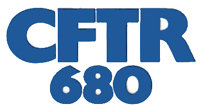
First CFTR logo as a top 40 station.

In 1973, programmer Chuck Camroux upped the ante in the Toronto radio "Rock and Roll Wars" by tweaking CFTR's notoriously bad signal, adding some reverb, and hiring new morning man Jim Brady to rival CHUM's Jay Nelson. Both stations hovered near one million listeners per week. Although Brady finally topped Nelson in the ratings in 1979, over-all, CFTR did not surpass CHUM in the Toronto BBM ratings until 1984. Once CFTR gained ratings supremacy, CHUM dropped Top 40 in favour of an adult contemporary music format in 1986.

CFTR also hired John Records Landecker from WLS in Chicago in 1981. Landecker spent two years at the station before returning to Chicago to work at WLUP. In 1983, CFTR began broadcasting in AM stereo using the Kahn-Hazeltine independent sideband system, and then switched to the Motorola system.

=== All-news era ===
680 News logo until 2015

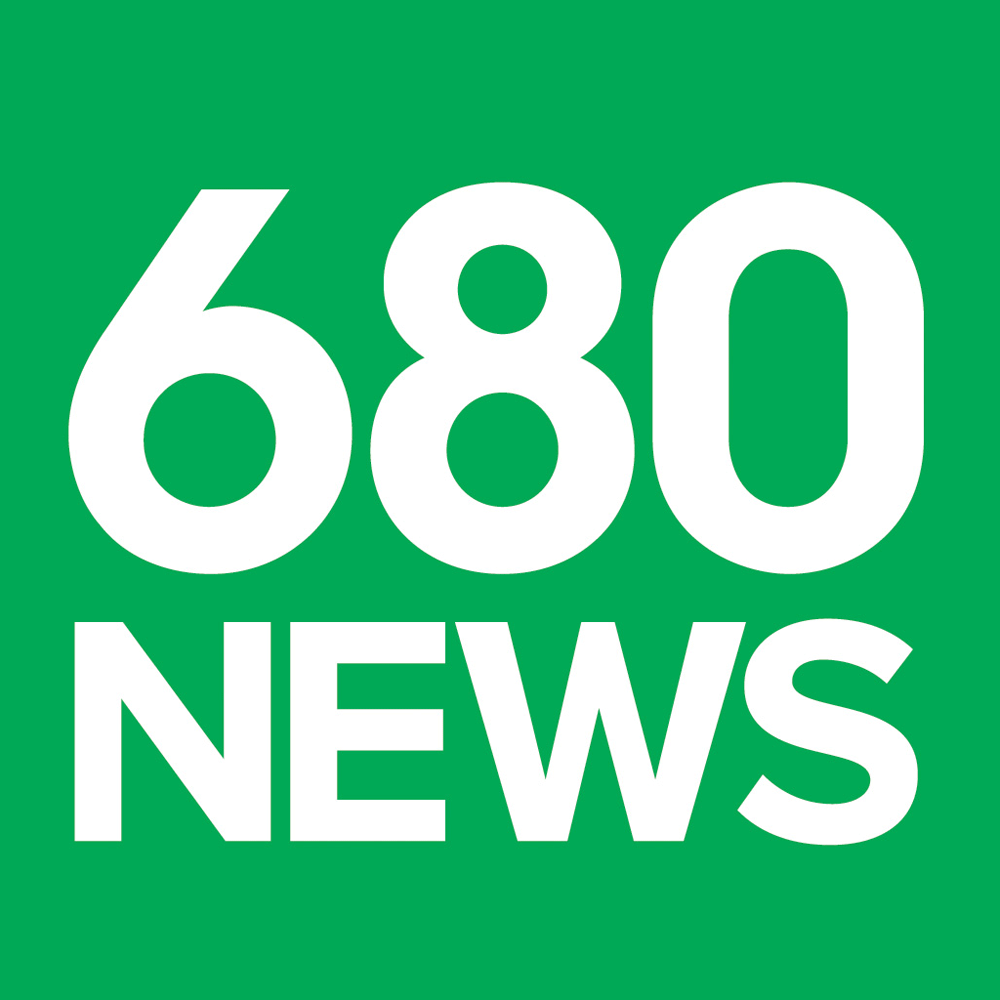
680 News logo until 2021.

Through the 1980s and 1990s, music listeners switched to FM, prompting AM stations like CFTR to find non-music formats. On June 1, 1993, at 10 a.m., CFTR announced it would be discontinuing the Top 40 format, and began broadcasting a countdown of "the top 500 songs of the (then) past 25 years" titled "The CFTR Story". At 6 a.m. on June 7, after playing Phil Collins' "Against All Odds" (which was the #1 song in the countdown) and Starship's "We Built This City" (which also ended CHUM's Top 40 era in 1986), and the station stopped broadcasting in AM stereo, CFTR adopted its present all-news radio format as "680 News". It was the first all-news radio station in Canada since the end of the former CKO network in 1989.

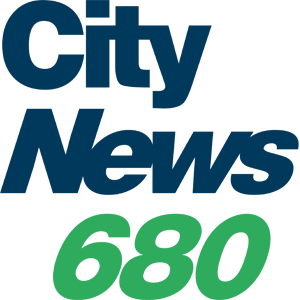
CityNews branding (2021–2024)

The station offers listeners a "weather guarantee" jackpot, which is drawn from a pool of listeners who enter the contest.

In June 2021, Rogers announced that it would rebrand its news radio stations under the CityNews brand to create a shared identity with local news on Citytv television stations and their corresponding smartphone app and website. The rebranding took effect on October 18, 2021, with the station rebranding as CityNews 680.

On March 25, 2024, as part of a reimaging of the CityNews brand, CFTR rebranded as 680 NewsRadio Toronto.

== Notable staff ==
- Bob McAdorey (1970–1976), formerly CHUM, later Global News entertainment editor and co-anchor
- Arlene Bynon - news (1980–1984) hosted Sunday, Sunday newsmagazine, moved to CHFI-FM and later hosted talk shows on the Global Television Network, AM 640, and SiriusXM Canada's Canada Talks channel
- John Records Landecker - morning man (1981–1983)
- Jesse and Gene - (Jesse Dylan and Gene Valaitis) (1989–1993), first in afternoon drive, moved to morning drive in 1991
- Chris Mavridis - reporter (1997–2000)
- Rick Moranis (using the stage name Rick Allen) - (c. 1973)
- Stephanie Smyth - news director and anchor (1993–2005), now a Liberal MPP in the Ontario legislature
