= Joel Farabee =

American ice hockey player (born 2000)

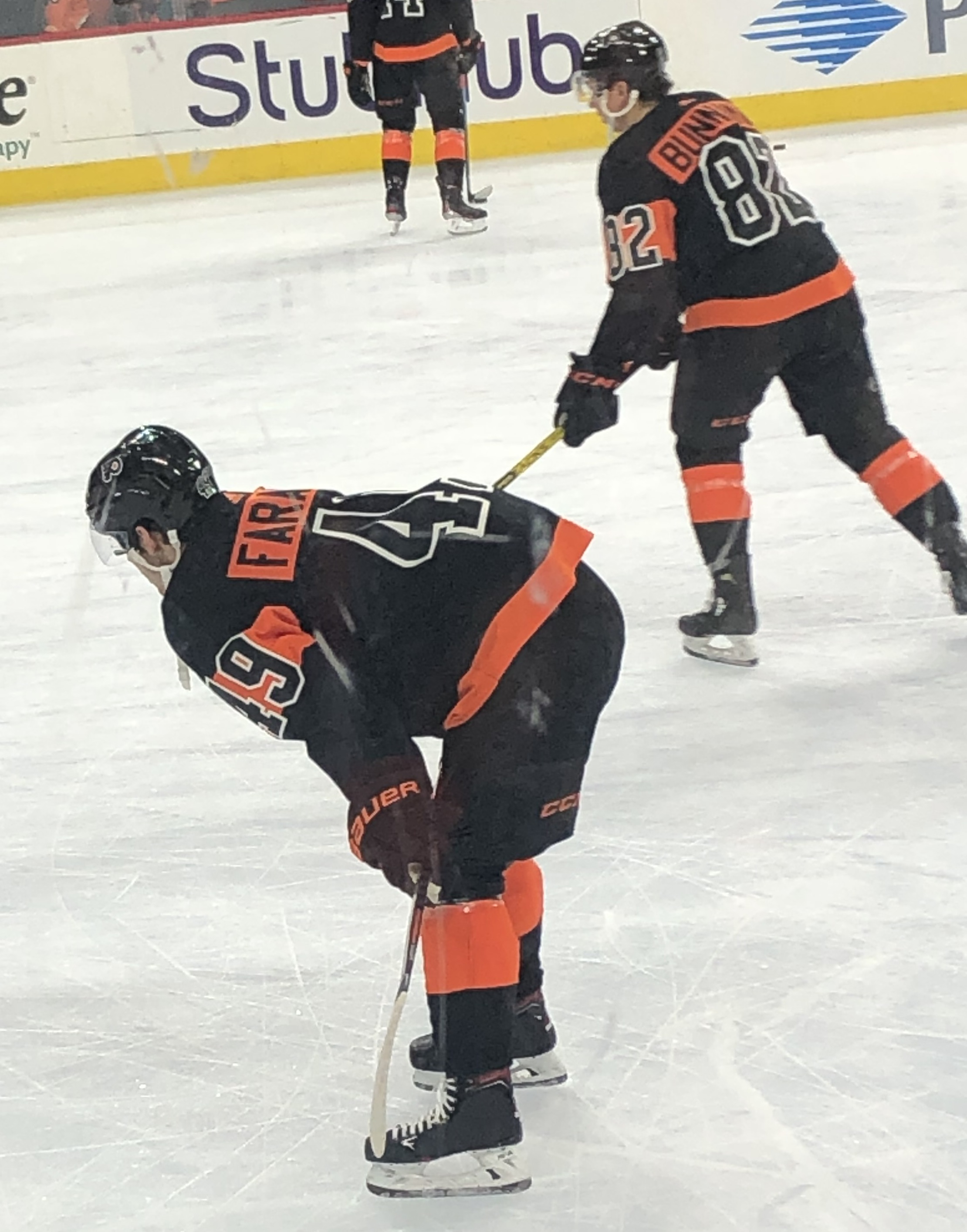
- Farabee with the Philadelphia Flyers in 2020
- Born: February 25, 2000 (age 26) Cicero, New York, U.S.
- Height: 6 ft 0 in (183 cm)
- Weight: 186 lb (84 kg; 13 st 4 lb)
- Position: Left wing
- Shoots: Left
- NHL team Former teams: Calgary Flames; Philadelphia Flyers
- National team: United States
- NHL draft: 14th overall, 2018; Philadelphia Flyers
- Playing career: 2019–present

Joel Farabee (born February 25, 2000) is an American professional ice hockey player who is a left winger for the Calgary Flames of the National Hockey League (NHL). Farabee was drafted in the first round, 14th overall at the 2018 NHL entry draft by the Philadelphia Flyers.

Growing up in Cicero, New York, Farabee competed with the Syracuse Nationals, Buffalo Jr Sabres, and Selects Hockey Academy at South Kent School. He joined the USA Hockey National Team Development Program in the United States Hockey League (USHL) before committing to play NCAA Division I ice hockey with the Boston University Terriers men's ice hockey team. During his time in college, Farabee tied for second in goals and third in points amongst rookies while leading the Terriers in goals, points, power-play goals, shorthanded goals, game-winning goals, plus-minus, and shots. In recognition of his efforts, Farabee received the Tim Taylor Award as college hockey's Rookie of the Year, Hockey East Rookie of the Year, and was selected for the Hockey East All-Rookie Team.

== Early life ==
Farabee was born on February 25, 2000, to business owner Dave and nursing supervisor Pam Farabee in Cicero, New York. Farabee credits his older brothers Jake and Jesse for inspiring his love of ice hockey saying, "I always watched them. They were on older teams. They inspired me to want to get to that level." He also credited his grandfather as being a role model for him growing up. Farabee's grandfather Joe Klodzen was drafted by the St. Louis Cardinals of Major League Baseball (MLB), but never made the major league roster and competed in their minor league system. As his father was born and raised in Philadelphia, Farabee grew up a fan of Philadelphia sports teams including the Philadelphia Eagles.

== Playing career ==
=== Amateur ===
As a child, Farabee competed with the Syracuse Nationals at the Bell Capital Cup in Ottawa before playing above his year level with the Buffalo Jr Sabres at the Quebec International Pee-Wee Hockey Tournament. During the Bell Capital Cup, he led the team with six goals and one power play point. In the ninth grade, when Farabee was recruited to play junior hockey in the Selects Hockey Academy at South Kent School, his family began taking his future career in hockey seriously. He played on the SASKS U16 National team before joining the USA Hockey National Team Development Program and competing in the United States Hockey League (USHL). Farabee was chosen to captain the team in his second year by coach Seth Appert as a result of his "competitive, all-around game that belies his size." Although originally committing to play NCAA Division I ice hockey with the University of New Hampshire, he changed his commitment to Boston University of Hockey East in 2015.

Farabee played one season with the Boston University Terriers men's ice hockey team, recording 36 points in 37 games. He praised his time with the Terriers, saying, "I think my down-low, below-the-goal-line game has gotten a lot better than it was a year ago...As far as protecting the puck and holding onto it and not making plays too fast to where I turn it over. That’s the big thing at the highest levels. That’s why college hockey was so good for me." He finished the 2018–19 season tied for second in goals and third in points amongst rookies while leading the Terriers in goals, points, power-play goals, shorthanded goals, game-winning goals, plus-minus, and shots. In recognition of his efforts, Farabee received the Tim Taylor Award as college hockey's Rookie of the Year, Hockey East Rookie of the Year, and was selected for the Hockey East All-Rookie Team.

Leading up to the 2018 NHL entry draft, Farabee was ranked 12th amongst all North American skaters by the NHL Central Scouting Bureau. He was listed as 6 ft 1 in (1.85 m) and was measured at 4 percent body fat during the NHL Scouting Combine. However, through showing his offensive prowess as team captain in the Development Program and at Boston University, Farabee was selected in the first round, 14th overall, by the Philadelphia Flyers in the 2018 draft on June 23, 2018. Speaking afterwards, Farabee said he was hoping to be drafted by Philadelphia because he was a fan of the Flyers growing up.

=== Professional ===
==== Philadelphia Flyers (2019–2025) ====
Farabee signed an entry-level contract with the Philadelphia Flyers on March 25, 2019, after his freshman season at Boston University. After being a healthy scratch during the Flyers' season opener in Prague, he was reassigned to their American Hockey League (AHL) affiliate, the Lehigh Valley Phantoms, to begin the season. He played four games with the Phantoms, recording three goals and one assist, before being recalled to the NHL for his debut. When reflecting on his early time in the professional league, Farabee said it helped him gain more confidence and comfortable with his stickhandling. As a result of his play, Farabee was honored as PSECU Player of the Week.

Upon making his NHL debut with the Flyers on October 21, 2019, against the Vegas Golden Knights, Farabee subsequently became the first Flyers player in franchise history to be born in the 2000s. Four days later, Farabee scored his first career NHL goal and assist against the Chicago Blackhawks but both were overturned due to teammate Kevin Hayes being offside. He officially earned his first NHL point later that game as an assist on Hayes’ third-period goal. It was not until the following month, however, that Farabee would record his first official goal in a 4–3 shootout win against the New Jersey Devils. Upon receiving a rebound from Michael Raffl, Farabee said he "closed his eyes" before shooting the puck into the net. Farabee remained with the Flyers before being suspended three games for interference during a contest against the Winnipeg Jets on December 15.

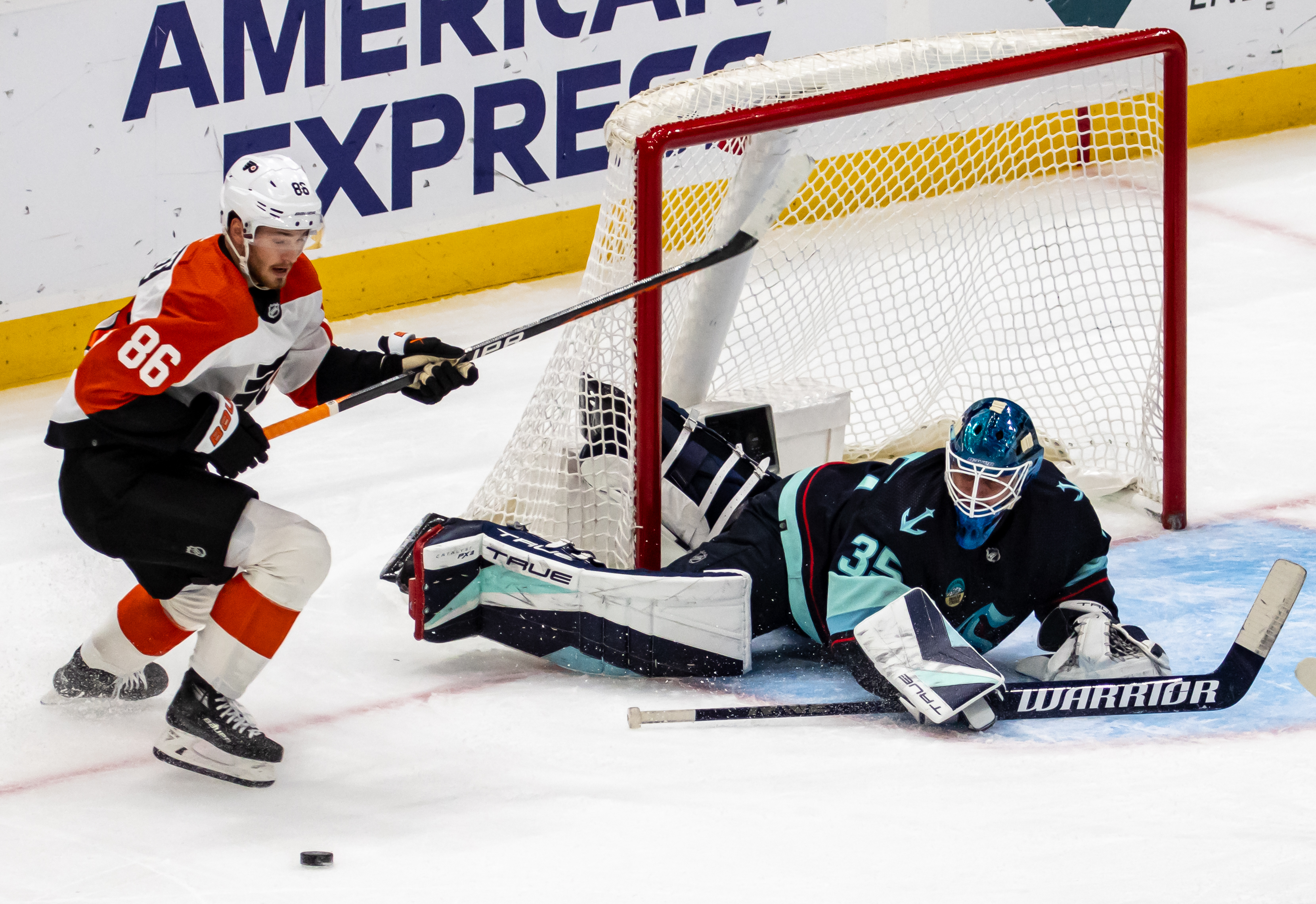
Farabee making a play on the puck next to goalie Joey Daccord of the Seattle Kraken in 2023.

After playing in 37 games with the Flyers, recording three goals and nine assists, Farabee was loaned to the Phantoms on January 15, 2020. He was recalled periodically throughout the second half of the season as a replacement for injured players, including James van Riemsdyk. By the conclusion of the shortened 2019–20 regular season, Farabee recorded 21 points through 52 games. During the 2020 Stanley Cup playoffs he recorded his first goal during the Round-Robin against the Tampa Bay Lightning, becoming the first NHL player born in the 2000s to score a postseason goal. As the Flyers beat the Lightning, he scored the game-winning goal against the Montreal Canadiens in Game 1 of the Eastern Conference First Round Playoffs. After playing well following his jump to the first line in the round-robin finale with Jakub Voráček (undisclosed issue) out, Farabee stayed with Claude Giroux and Sean Couturier in Game 1. He remained with the team during their playoff berth as they lost in the Eastern Conference Second Round against the New York Islanders. During the series, Farabee suffered a hit to the head and neck from Adam Pelech in Game 5 and was forced to sit out for the two remaining games to recover.

Farabee returned to the Flyers' training camp for the 2020–21 season having gained nine pounds and stating he felt "a lot more confident." He made his season debut on January 13 against the Pittsburgh Penguins, during which he tied a franchise record for most points in a season-opener by scoring four points in the 6–3 win. Later that month, Farabee scored his first NHL hat trick in a 4–3 overtime win against the Islanders, becoming the second youngest Flyers player to achieve this feat during the regular season. He finished the season with 20 goals and 18 assists for a career high 38 points. As such, Farabee was awarded the Pelle Lindbergh Memorial Trophy, given to the most improved Flyer as voted by his teammates.

Following his career-best season, Farabee signed a six-year, $30 million contract extension with the Flyers on September 2, 2021. With the off-season acquisition of Cam Atkinson, Farabee began the season on a high-scoring line alongside him and Derick Brassard. However, after experiencing a pointless drought through eight games, Farabee was placed on a line with Scott Laughton for a game against the Carolina Hurricanes.

In January 2025, Farabee joined teammate Scott Laughton as a Flyers' Pride ambassador for their annual pride night game. However, Laughton was unable to play on the night of the game due to personal matters and Farabee took on the role by himself.

==== Calgary Flames (2025–present) ====
During the 2024–25 season, his sixth with the Flyers, Farabee was traded along with Morgan Frost to the Calgary Flames in exchange for Andrei Kuzmenko, Jakob Pelletier and two draft picks on January 30, 2025.

== Playing style ==
Farabee says he models his playing style after Tampa Bay Lightning forward Jake Guentzel. The comparisons were focused on their skating ability, playmaking, and hockey IQ. He has also drawn comparisons to Brad Marchand and Zach Parise due to his "high motor and a good deal of intensity." During the Flyers' training camp in 2019, teammate Jakub Voráček called him a "smart player" who was hard to catch up with.

== International play ==
Medal record

Representing United States

Ice hockey

World Junior Championships
Silver medal – second place	2019 Canada	

World U18 Championships
Gold medal – first place	2017 Slovakia	
Silver medal – second place	2018 Russia	

Farabee has represented the United States at various international competitions at the junior level. His first time representing the United States internationally was at the 2017 IIHF World U18 Championships in Slovakia. He played in seven games, recording six points, as the team went on to win a gold medal. The following year, Farabee competed at the 2018 IIHF World U18 Championships, where he recorded four goals and four assists for eight points in seven games to lead the team to a silver medal.

Farabee was named to the 2019 World Junior Ice Hockey Championships team for the United States men's national junior ice hockey team. During a game against Kazakhstan on December 28, 2018, Farabee recorded a natural hat-trick in the first period to lead the United States to an 8–2 win. He ended the tournament with five points in seven games as the United States earned another silver medal.

== Career statistics ==
=== Regular season and playoffs ===
			Regular season					Playoffs
Season	Team	League	GP	G	A	Pts	PIM	GP	G	A	Pts	PIM
2016–17	U.S. National Development Team	USHL	30	12	11	23	22	—	—	—	—	—
2017–18	U.S. National Development Team	USHL	26	15	25	40	18	—	—	—	—	—
2018–19	Boston University	HE	37	17	19	36	57	—	—	—	—	—
2019–20	Lehigh Valley Phantoms	AHL	5	3	1	4	2	—	—	—	—	—
2019–20	Philadelphia Flyers	NHL	52	8	13	21	39	12	3	2	5	4
2020–21	Philadelphia Flyers	NHL	55	20	18	38	28	—	—	—	—	—
2021–22	Philadelphia Flyers	NHL	63	17	17	34	50	—	—	—	—	—
2022–23	Philadelphia Flyers	NHL	82	15	24	39	41	—	—	—	—	—
2023–24	Philadelphia Flyers	NHL	82	22	28	50	37	—	—	—	—	—
2024–25	Philadelphia Flyers	NHL	50	8	11	19	26	—	—	—	—	—
2024–25	Calgary Flames	NHL	31	3	3	6	8	—	—	—	—	—
2025–26	Calgary Flames	NHL	82	20	18	38	28	—	—	—	—	—
NHL totals			497	113	132	245	257	12	3	2	5	4

=== International ===
Year	Team	Event	Result	GP	G	A	Pts	PIM
2016	United States	U17	5th	5	4	2	6	6
2017	United States	U18	1st place, gold medalist(s)	7	3	3	6	6
2018	United States	U18	2nd place, silver medalist(s)	7	4	4	8	6
2019	United States	WJC	2nd place, silver medalist(s)	7	3	2	5	2
2024	United States	WC	5th	8	1	1	2	0
Junior totals				26	14	11	25	20
Senior totals				8	1	1	2	0

== Awards and honors ==
Award	Year	Ref
College
Hockey East All-Rookie Team	2019	
Hockey East Rookie of the Year	2019	
Tim Taylor Award	2019	
Philadelphia Flyers
Pelle Lindbergh Memorial Trophy	2021	

Awards and achievements
Preceded by Morgan Frost	Philadelphia Flyers first-round draft pick 2018	Succeeded by Jay O'Brien
Preceded by Logan Hutsko	Hockey East Rookie of the Year; 2018–19	Succeeded by Alex Newhook
Preceded by Scott Perunovich	Tim Taylor Award; 2018–19	Succeeded by Alex Newhook
