= Andy Frost (radio personality) =

Canadian radio personality

- Born: April 15, 1956 (age 70); Winnipeg, Manitoba, Canada
- Education: Gordon Bell High School
- Occupations: Radio personality, voice actor, emcee, club host, narration & voice overs

Andrew J. Frost (born April 15, 1956) is a retired Canadian radio personality most recently employed by 94.3 The Drive in Winnipeg, Manitoba before the station dropped its "classic rock" format in 2021. He is best known for his work with Q107 and AM 640 in Toronto, Ontario from 1985 to 2018 and as the public address announcer for the Toronto Maple Leafs at Air Canada Centre from 1999 to 2016. He replaced long-time PA announcer Paul Morris who retired at the end of the 1998–99 hockey season. Earlier in his radio career, Frost worked at 92 CITI-FM and 58 CKY-AM in Winnipeg.

== Early life and education ==
Born and raised in Winnipeg, Frost was heavily influenced by the very strong radio market there, and the sensational local music scene. Late at night, if the signal was clear, he would frequently tune in WLS 890 in Chicago to listen to something different than what was offered in his hometown.

In his teens, Frost had a variety of jobs, including working with juvenile delinquents and severely intellectually disabled children, selling newspaper subscriptions for the Winnipeg Tribune, and working as a professional waiter and a fashion model.

== Radio career ==
Frost's broadcast career started in Winnipeg in the late 1970s. He first worked as a volunteer disc jockey, hosting an on-air music program at the University of Manitoba's college station CJUM-FM 101.5 in 1978. After his initial stint at CJUM-FM 101.5, in the fall of 1979, Frost was offered a position at 92 CITI-FM, where he had the benefit of working with a staff that included "Brother" Jake Edwards, Terry Dimonte, Howard Mandshein, Steve Young, Gary "Magic" Christian and others. Frost was named music director of CITI-FM shortly thereafter. During his tenure at CITI-FM, he also worked as the radio commentator for the Winnipeg Jets for CITI-FM's sister station 58 CKY-AM. He moved to Toronto in the fall of 1985 when he was offered the position of music director at Q107 Toronto, along with hosting a new show called Psychedelic Psunday. As a part of corporate restructuring, Frost was let go in May 2018 after being with Q107 for a total of 33 years. In 2019, Frost returned to the Winnipeg working the evening shift at 94.3 The Drive (CHIQ-FM)

== Hockey broadcasting ==
As the color commentator for the NHL's Winnipeg Jets for 3 seasons (1982-1985), Frost returned to work on radio covering NHL Hockey in Toronto. Toronto is one of Canada's largest hockey markets and Frost broke into the competitive market in 1996 as the host of the post-game show "Leaf Talk" on AM 640. Further, Frost became the third public address announcer in the history of the Toronto Maple Leafs franchise, beginning in the 1999-2000 season, when the Toronto Maple Leafs moved to their new venue, Air Canada Centre, until he was not re-signed after the 2015–2016 season. Mike Ross succeeded Frost as the team's public address announcer in the 2016-2017 season.

== Psychedelic Psunday ==
"Psychedelic Psunday" aired on Toronto's Q107 every Sunday for 33 years, until the show ended in 2018. The program consisted entirely of music from the psychedelic era, spanning from 1965 to 1975. The program began with Alice Cooper's rendition of "Hello Hooray". The Doors, Led Zeppelin, Neil Young, The Beatles and Pink Floyd were most commonly heard throughout the program.

== Frost Overnight on Q-107 ==
Andy Frost keeps the late night listeners of Q107 company during the Frost Overnight Show, from Midnight to 5:00am, Monday night through Thursday night, with a wide selection of classic rock tracks.

== The Post Game Show with Andy Frost ==
Andy was also the host of "The Post Game Show with Andy Frost" which aired after every Toronto Maple Leaf game on AM640 Toronto Radio. Andy invited listeners to call in and share their thoughts on the game. Many new and regular callers (such as Mike in Buffalo) frequented the show and provided commentary and analysis on the games. The show was full of in-depth commentary, analysis, updates on the night's action and listener calls and comments. As AM 640 says, "It's the fans who have the final say". The show started in 1996 under the name "Leaf Talk". In January 2013, the show's title was changed to "The Post Game Show with Andy Frost" because AM 640 no longer had the broadcast rights for the Toronto Maple Leaf games. Nonetheless, the hockey tradition continued after every game under the new title: "The Post Game Show with Andy Frost". On October 8, 2015, Andy Frost announced on Twitter that the Post Game Show had been discontinued.

== Personal life ==
Frost is a graduate of Gordon Bell High School. His son, Morgan Frost is a professional ice hockey centre currently playing with the Calgary Flames in the National Hockey League.

== Radiography ==
Year	Station	Program
1978-89	CJUM University of Manitoba	Radio announcer
1975-85	92 CITI FM	Radio Personality
1982-85	CKY 58	Color Commentator for the Winnipeg Jets
1985-88	Q~107 FM	Music Director and host of "Psychedelic Psunday"
1988-89	Q~107 FM	Program Director
1991-97	Rock Radio Network	Host of "Overnight" syndicated across Canada on 24 stations and broadcast via satellite internationally
1998–2018	Q~107 FM	Host of "Psychedelic Psunday"
2006–2018	Q~107 FM	Host of "Frost Overnight"
1996-2015	AM 640	Host of "Leaf Talk" (As of January 2013, the show was called "The Post Game Show with Andy Frost")
1999-2012	AM 640	Host of "The Leafs Tonight" pre-game show for all Toronto Maple Leaf road games
2013–2018	AM 640	Host of "Frost on Ice"
2019—2021	94.3 The Drive	Evening host
