= Amanda Cupido =

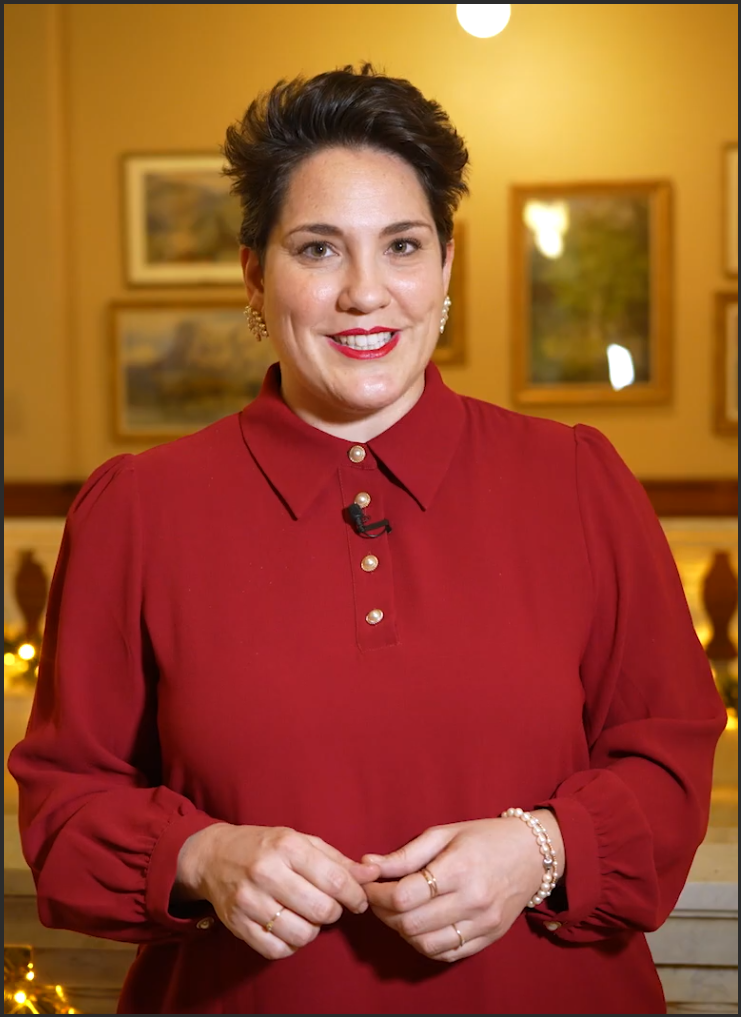
Cupido at Queen's Park in 2025

Amanda Cupido is a Canadian podcast producer, professor, and writer.

== Education ==
Cupido received her Bachelor of Journalism from Toronto Metropolitan University (formerly known as Ryerson University) in 2012, and a master's degree in Professional Studies in the psychology of leadership at Pennsylvania State University.

== Career ==
Cupido was an on-camera presenter for the Legislative Assembly of Ontario. From 2016 to 2020, Cupido held roles with World Vision Canada and World Vision International as a social media specialist and communications advisor. She oversaw Corus Entertainment's AM 640 Toronto.

In 2020, Cupido started a podcast production company called Lead Podcasting, which was later acquired by The Walrus. She has made many podcasts, including "Remember This". In 2021, she was part of the Canadian Delegation for G20 Young Entrepreneurs' Alliance Summit. In 2025, she was a recipient of a Women of Inspiration award.

Cupido has spoken at several conferences including TEDx Toronto Metropolitan University and the OAB Connections Conference.

== Selected bibliography ==
Cupido is the author of Let's Talk Podcasting: The Essential Guide to Doing it Right, and Let's Talk Podcasting for Kids.
