= Rebecca Rosenblat =

Canadian psychotherapist

Rebecca Rosenblat-Billings
- Education: PhD in Clinical Sexology
- Occupations: Clinical sexologist, psychotherapist, author

Rebecca Rosenblat-Billings is a Canadian psychotherapist, clinical sexologist, author, and television and radio host. Her work has focused on relationships, sexuality, and female empowerment. She has appeared in Canadian media as a commentator on relationship and sexuality topics.

== Career ==
Rosenblat-Billings is a registered psychotherapist in Ontario. She has worked in private practice and as a clinical associate at Bayridge Counselling Centres, specializing in relationships, sexuality, trauma, and addiction.

Alongside her clinical work, Rosenblat-Billings has worked in television and radio. In 2001, she hosted a call-in sex show for Mojo Radio on Talk 640, a Toronto radio station.Rosenblat-Billings has also appeared as a relationship and sexuality commentator in Canadian media. ELLE Canada has featured her as an expert in articles concerning relationships, dating, and sexuality.

Rosenblat-Billings hosted Between the Sheets with Rebecca Rosenblat for W Network and the Oprah Winfrey Network (OWN), a program that was later broadcast by Prime. She also co-hosted Prenup Challenge for VisionTV and One. Rosenblat-Billings hosted Sex with Rebecca for CHCH-TV and hosted other call-in programs, including Sex @ 11, Sex @ 11 with Rebecca, and Sex @ 10 with Rebecca. She was shortlisted for the Gemini Awards in the Lifestyle/TV Host category for her television work.

In 2015, Rosenblat-Billings hosted Kama Sutra, an original series broadcast by OMNI Television. The program addressed relationship and intimacy questions and was presented in Hindi and Urdu for South Asian audiences.

She also gives public talks on relationships and sexuality. In 2023, she delivered a TEDxUofT talk titled Female Sexuality: Breaking Down Taboos, concerning cultural attitudes and psychological issues surrounding female sexuality

== Bibliography ==
Rosenblat-Billings has written fiction and non-fiction. Her published works include:

• Overcoming Betrayal: The Breakthrough Therapeutic Approach – A Couple's Guide to Healing from Both Perspectives (Manor House Publishing, 2017)

• Awaken Your Sensual Goddess: Make Your Dreams Blossom (Manor House Publishing, 2022)

• Sexual Power: You've Got It – Now Use It (Manor House Publishing, 2014)

• Seducing Your Man: The Honeymoon Was Just the Beginning (Burman Books, 2006)

• Mid-Rift (Manor House Publishing, 2019)
