= Sean Couturier =

Canadian ice hockey player (born 1992)

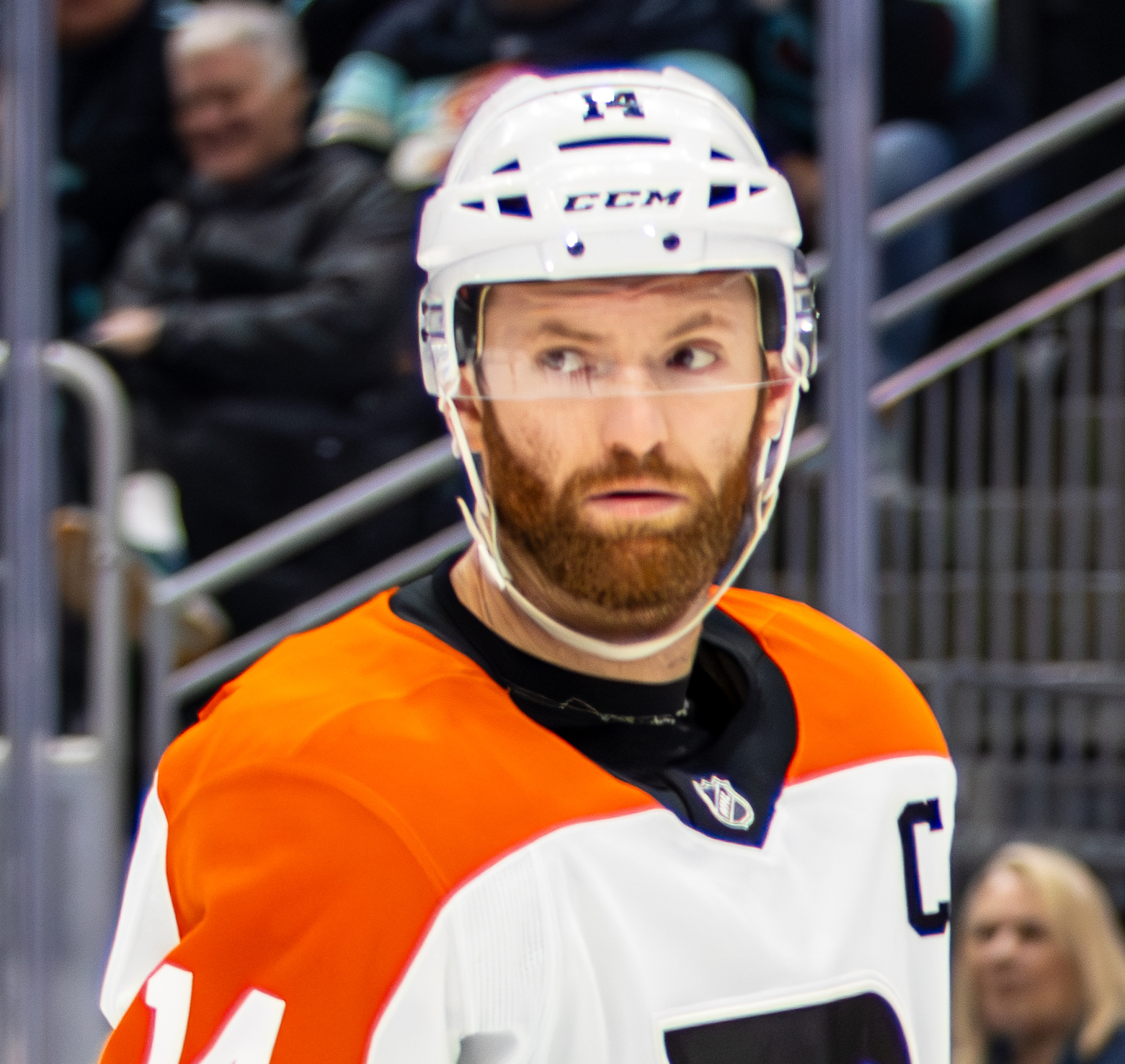
- Couturier with the Philadelphia Flyers in October 2024
- Born: December 7, 1992 (age 33) Phoenix, Arizona, U.S.
- Height: 6 ft 3 in (191 cm)
- Weight: 211 lb (96 kg; 15 st 1 lb)
- Position: Centre
- Shoots: Left
- NHL team: Philadelphia Flyers
- National team: Canada
- NHL draft: 8th overall, 2011; Philadelphia Flyers
- Playing career: 2011–present

Sean Gerald Couturier (/kuːˈtʊərieɪ/ koo-TOOR-ee-ay; born December 7, 1992) is an American-born Canadian professional ice hockey player who is a centre and captain for the Philadelphia Flyers of the National Hockey League (NHL). The Flyers selected him in the first round, eighth overall, in the 2011 NHL entry draft.

Couturier was born in Phoenix, Arizona, where his father was playing hockey at the time, but moved to Bathurst, New Brunswick after his father's retirement. He played minor ice hockey there for several years, but spent a year in the Saskatchewan AAA league after a failed tryout for the Quebec AAA roster. After he won a league championship with Saskatchewan, Couturier was drafted second overall by the Drummondville Voltigeurs of the Quebec Major Junior Hockey League (QMJHL). Following a modest rookie season, Couturier scored 96 points as a 17-year-old in the 2009–10 season. Despite a battle with mononucleosis, he repeated that point number again in the 2010–11 season. During his junior ice hockey career, Couturier also began representing Canada at a number of international tournaments, including the World U-17 Hockey Challenge, the Ivan Hlinka Memorial Tournament, and the IIHF World Junior Championship.

After signing with the Flyers in 2011, Couturier joined the team for the 2011–12 NHL season. His contract stipulated that Couturier would play with the Flyers for a 10-game "trial period", during which he impressed enough to remain on the roster for the entire season. He struggled offensively during his first few seasons in the NHL, but found his rhythm in 2013, when he was placed on an offensive line alongside Steve Downie. Seeing consistent production from Couturier on a defensively-minded line in the 2013–14 and 2014–15 seasons, the Flyers signed him to a six-year contract extension in July 2015. He continued to skate for Canada at international tournaments even after joining the Flyers, with three appearances at the Ice Hockey World Championships, as well as a showing at the 2016 World Cup of Hockey.

Couturier's next few NHL seasons were hindered by injury. During the 2015–16 season, he lost time first to a concussion, then to a lower body injury, and finally to a shoulder injury. In November 2016, he sprained the medial collateral ligament (MCL) in his left knee during a game against the Florida Panthers, and missed over a month of the season. MCL injuries would continue to affect Couturier, who tore the ligament during the 2018 Stanley Cup playoffs and injured it again shortly before the 2018–19 season. Despite his injuries, Couturier steadily improved as a two-way player: he won his first Gene Hart Memorial Award in 2018, his first Bobby Clarke Trophy in 2019, and he was the 2020 recipient of the Frank J. Selke Trophy, given to the top defensive forward in the NHL.

== Early life ==
Couturier was born on December 7, 1992, in Phoenix, Arizona. His family was Canadian, but lived in the area at the time because his father, Sylvain Couturier, was playing in the now-defunct International Hockey League for the Phoenix Roadrunners. When Sylvain retired from professional hockey in 2001, the Couturiers relocated to Bathurst, New Brunswick, where Sean attended both French and English-language schools. Because his father was often busy, serving as a hockey coach and later as the general manager for the Acadie-Bathurst Titan, Couturier grew close with his paternal grandmother, Denise, who moved in with the family after the death of her husband.

When Couturier was 10 years old, an administrative mistake assigned him to the adolescent "Peewee" minor ice hockey team, rather than the "Atom" team made for players of his age. Couturier received permission to remain in the Peewee league, and he went on to lead his team in scoring for the year. Although he also played baseball and basketball in high school at École Secondaire Népisiguit, hockey remained the primary object of Couturier's attention. When he failed to break into the Quebec midget AAA hockey team, Couturier spent a year with the Notre Dame Hounds of the Saskatchewan Male U18 AAA Hockey League instead. Playing alongside future National Hockey League (NHL) standouts Jaden Schwartz and Brandon Gormley, Couturier helped lead the Hounds to a league championship in 2008.

== Playing career ==
=== Amateur ===
After his time with the Hounds, the Drummondville Voltigeurs of the Quebec Major Junior Hockey League (QMJHL) selected Couturier second overall in the 2008 QMJHL Entry Draft, and he began playing junior ice hockey for Drummondville at the age of 15. He received limited ice time as a rookie in the 2008–09 season, often playing on the lower offensive lines, and coach Guy Boucher told Couturier that, if he wanted to become an elite player, he would need to focus on his defensive abilities as much as his offence and become a two-way player. In 58 rookie games, Couturier scored nine goals and 22 assists, for a total of 31 points. Drummondville, meanwhile, finished the regular season at the top of the QMJHL, with 112 points. They captured their first ever President's Cup, awarded to the champions of the QMJHL tournament, in 2009, and earned an automatic advancement to the Canadian Hockey League (CHL) Memorial Cup. Drummondville was left short-handed during the Memorial Cup when a bout of influenza spread through the team, and were ultimately eliminated in the semifinals with a 3–2 overtime loss to the Windsor Spitfires of the Ontario Hockey League (OHL).

The 2009–10 QMJHL season proved to be a break-out for Couturier, who scored 41 goals and 55 assists in 68 games with Drummondville. It was the first time that a 17-year-old led the league in scoring since Sidney Crosby put up 168 points in 62 games for the Rimouski Océanic during the 2004–05 season. Couturier was honoured for his performance with the Jean Béliveau Trophy, given annually to the top scorer in the QMJHL. He was also named a second-team QMJHL All-Star. Meanwhile, Drummondville advanced to the semifinal round of the 2010 President's Cup, but was eliminated by the Moncton Wildcats in the best-of-seven series.

Couturier missed 10 games at the start of the 2010–11 season after contracting mononucleosis. Even after he returned to the ice, Couturier continued to experience bouts of fatigue that carried throughout the season and into the beginning of his NHL career. He ultimately pushed through his delayed season start, putting up 20 goals in the final 21 regular season games to tie his previous season points number. Drummondville went on to sweep the Chicoutimi Sagueneens in the first round of the 2011 President's Cup playoffs, with Couturier scoring three goals and eight points in the series. Although the Gatineau Olympiques took the second round in six games, Couturier scored an additional three goals in that series. His six total playoff goals were the highest on the team, and he was tied for first in playoff points with 11. At the end of the season, the QMJHL awarded Couturier with both the Michael Bossy Trophy, given to the top prospect in the league, and the Michel Brière Memorial Trophy, given to the league's MVP. He was also named a QMJHL First-Team All-Star.

=== Philadelphia Flyers ===
==== 2011–2014 ====
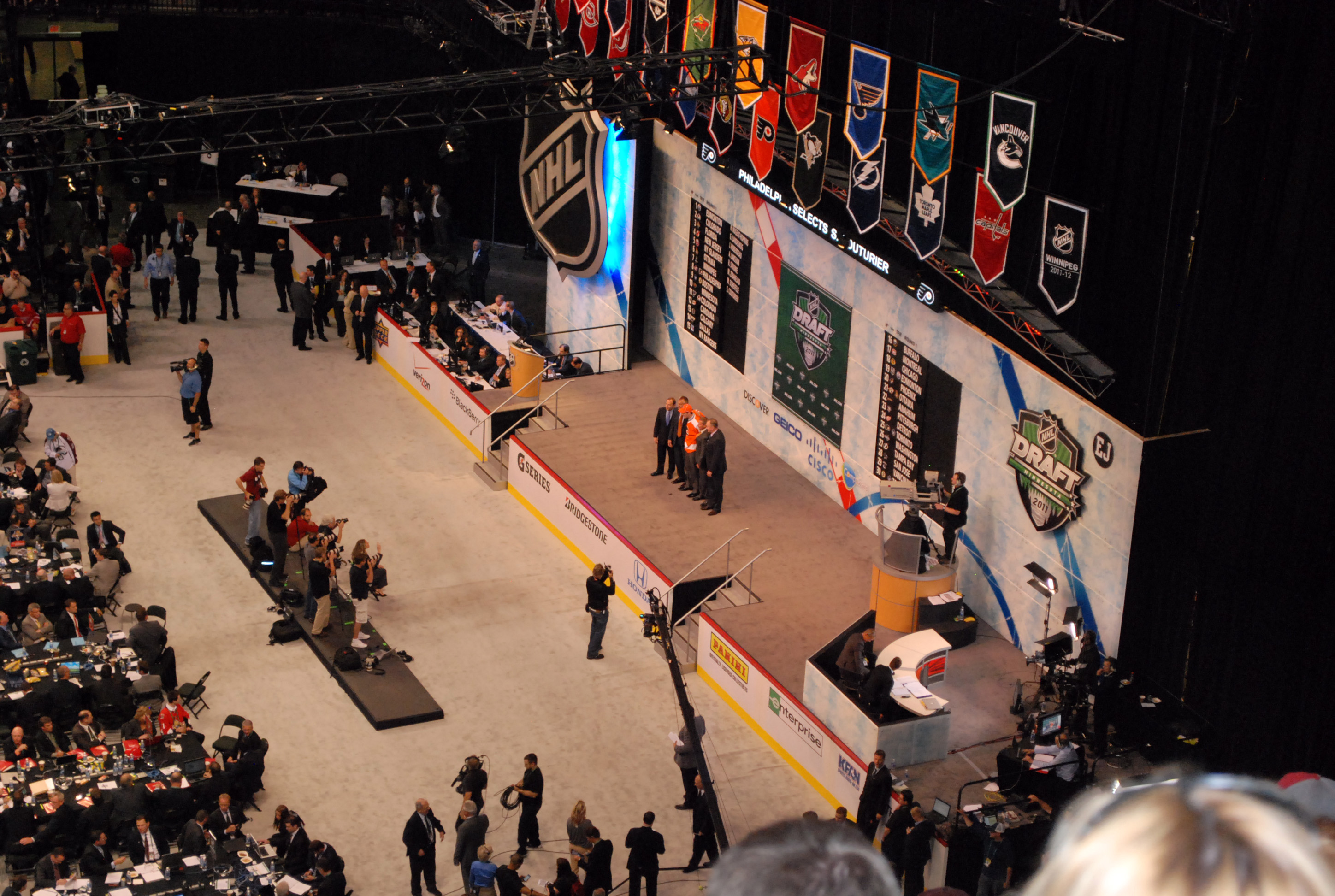
Couturier onstage after being selected by the Flyers at the 2011 NHL entry draft

Going into the 2011 NHL entry draft, the NHL Central Scouting Bureau ranked Couturier the sixth-highest prospect among all eligible North American skaters. The Philadelphia Flyers ultimately selected him eighth overall in the draft, using an extra pick that they had gained in a deal with the Columbus Blue Jackets. That September, Couturier signed a three-year, entry-level contract with the Flyers, with a cap hit of $1.375 million per season. As part of the rules of his contract, Couturier was allowed to play for the first 10 games of the Flyers season, after which the team would need to either move another player off of the 50-man roster or send Couturier back down to junior hockey. Due to his age, he was not eligible to play in the American Hockey League (AHL). Couturier impressed the Flyers at training camp, and after the Montreal Canadiens claimed Blair Betts off of waivers, a position opened on the 50-man roster in case they wanted to keep him through the end of the season.

Couturier made his NHL debut on October 6, 2011, alongside fellow rookie Matt Read, in a 2–1 defeat of the Boston Bruins. He scored his first goal with the Flyers on October 19, in the final five minutes of a 7–2 victory over the Ottawa Senators. Couturier's skill on the defensive end emerged during his first few games, with a particular strength on the penalty kill, and he remained on the team even after the 10-game "trial period". That January, Couturier played in the NHL All-Star Game, where he participated in a breakaway challenge during the skills competition. During the 2012 Stanley Cup playoffs, Couturier was primarily tasked with slowing down Evgeni Malkin in the Flyers' series against the Pittsburgh Penguins. On April 13, 2012, during the second game of the Flyers–Penguins series, Couturier and Claude Giroux both scored hat tricks to take the Flyers to an 8–5 win. Couturier, 19 years old at the time, was the first teenage skater to score a hat trick in the NHL playoffs since Ted Kennedy in 1945. The Flyers ultimately fell to the New Jersey Devils in the Eastern Conference Semifinals after Giroux was suspended for an illegal headshot. Couturier finished his rookie season with 27 points in 77 regular season games, and an additional four playoff points.

Couturier's second season with the Flyers was delayed due to the 2012–13 NHL lockout, as owners and the NHL Players' Association disputed over a new collective bargaining agreement. Despite the NHL lockout, the AHL started its 2012–13 season on time, and both Couturier and fellow 2011–12 rookie Brayden Schenn spent time playing for the Adirondack Phantoms, the Flyers' AHL affiliate, as they waited for the NHL to resume play. In 31 games with the Phantoms, Couturier scored 10 goals and 18 assists. The NHL season, when it resumed, was shortened to 48 regular season games. The Flyers stumbled out of the gate, going 2–6 in their first eight matches of the year. They did not recover as the season went on, finishing with a 23–22–3 record and missing the playoffs. Many of the team's struggles were attributed to off-season roster moves, with the loss of free agents Jaromír Jágr and Matt Carle, as well as the absence of a dependable backup goaltender for Ilya Bryzgalov. Couturier, however, experienced a sophomore slump, dropping from third among the team in goals scored to ninth and winning only 43.5 per cent of his face-offs. He dropped to four goals and 15 points in 46 games of the lockout-shortened season.

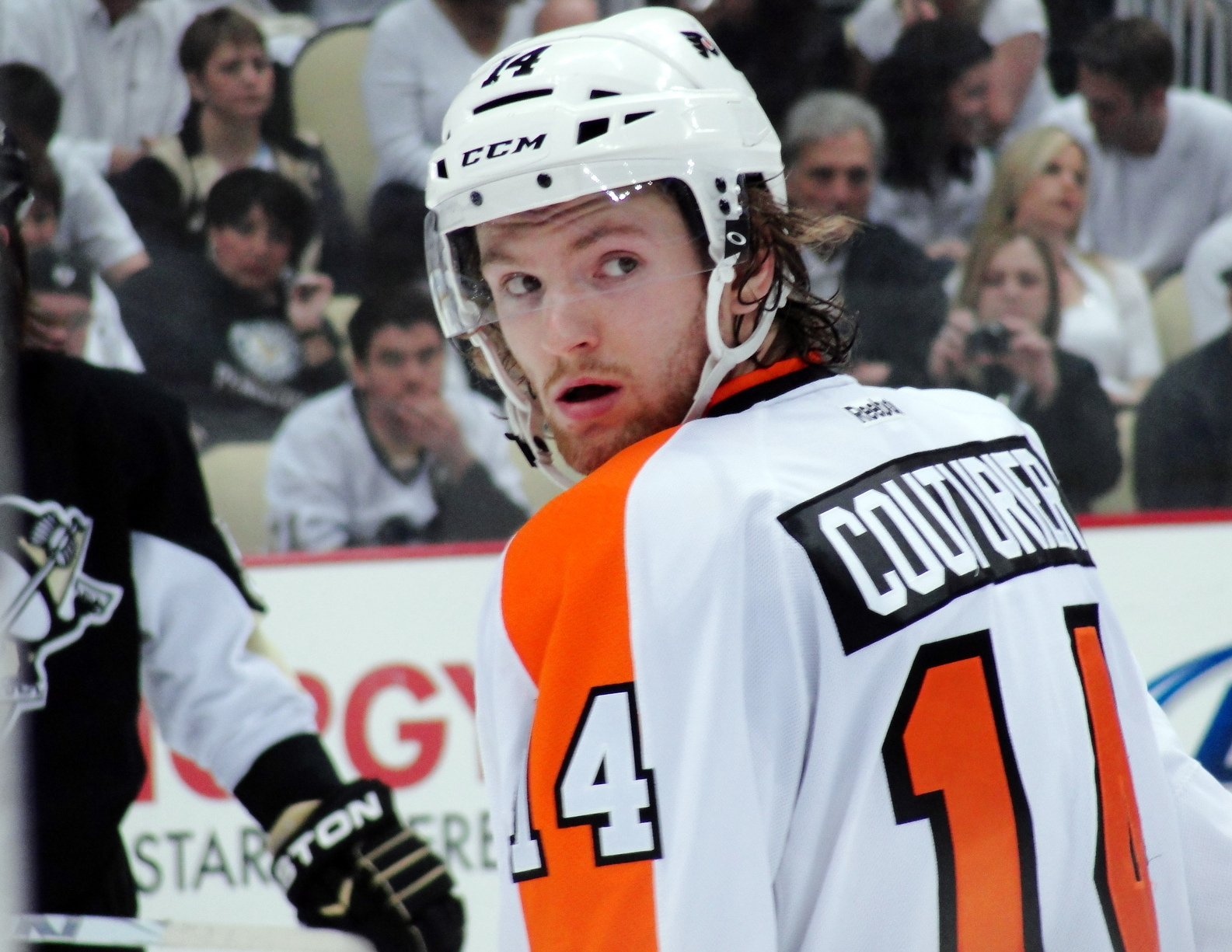
Couturier with the Flyers in the first round of the 2012 Stanley Cup playoffs.

On July 20, 2013, the Flyers signed Couturier to a two-year, $3.5 million contract extension. The Flyers' head coach, Peter Laviolette, was abruptly fired three games into the 2013–14 NHL season. ESPN speculated that part of the decision behind the firing was a concern that Couturier and Schenn, who were supporting rising star centre Giroux, were not developing as anticipated. Laviolette's replacement, Craig Berube, pushed Giroux and Couturier's ice time throughout the season, telling reporters, "I like to keep the forwards to less than 20 minutes in a game as a rule, but I've always made exceptions for Giroux and Couturier." When the Flyers acquired Steve Downie from the Colorado Avalanche in the fall, he was placed on the third line to wing Couturier and Read. Couturier saw an almost immediate improvement after being paired with Downie; the line scored a combined 25 points in a 10-game span, and Couturier told The Philadelphia Inquirer that Downie was "a big part of the success of our line". By the end of the season, Couturier had reached a career-high 39 points, including 13 goals. The Flyers appeared in the 2014 Stanley Cup playoffs, but were eliminated by the New York Rangers in the first round.

==== 2014–2018 ====
For the 2014–15 season, Couturier centered a checking line, with Read and R. J. Umberger on the wings. Although the line started strong defensively, their offensive production was limited at the start of the season. Couturier, frustrated with his reputation as a primarily defensive player, broke a 10-game goalless streak in December with a stretch of three goals and seven points in a span of six games. He played in all 82 games for the Flyers that season, building his iron man streak to 198 consecutive games, and finished the season with a career-high 15 goals and 22 assists, for a total of 37 points. On July 28, 2015, one year before Couturier was set to become a restricted free agent, the Flyers signed him to a six-year, $26 million contract extension. Still only 22 years old at the time of the extension, Couturier was considered a central piece of the Flyers' rebuilding plan, complementing new captain Giroux.

On October 21, 2015, shortly into the 2015–16 season, Couturier took a hit off of ex-teammate Zac Rinaldo during a game against the Bruins. He was diagnosed with a concussion, missing a stretch of games into early November, and blamed himself for the Flyers' losing streak during his absence. He rejoined the line-up on November 5, and continued to put up defensive skill for the Flyers, but struggled to produce offensively. In his first seven games after returning from concussion protocols, Couturier did not register a single point. He recovered by mid-December, scoring six goals and eight assists between December 15 and January 21, before his season was derailed again due to a lower body injury. Injuries continued to plague Couturier through the end of the season. After leaving a game against the Nashville Predators on February 4, general manager Ron Hextall told reporters that Couturier was still suffering from the lower-body injury, and would need to miss four weeks to recover. In Game 1 of a 2016 Stanley Cup playoffs series against the Washington Capitals, Couturier took a hit from Alex Ovechkin and left the game early. He was later diagnosed with a sprained acromioclavicular joint that would bench him for two weeks, through the remainder of the Capitals playoff series. The Capitals ultimately took the series in six games. Despite missing 19 games in the 2015–16 season, Couturier continued to improve his scoring, jumping to 11 goals and 28 assists in the 63 games that he did play.

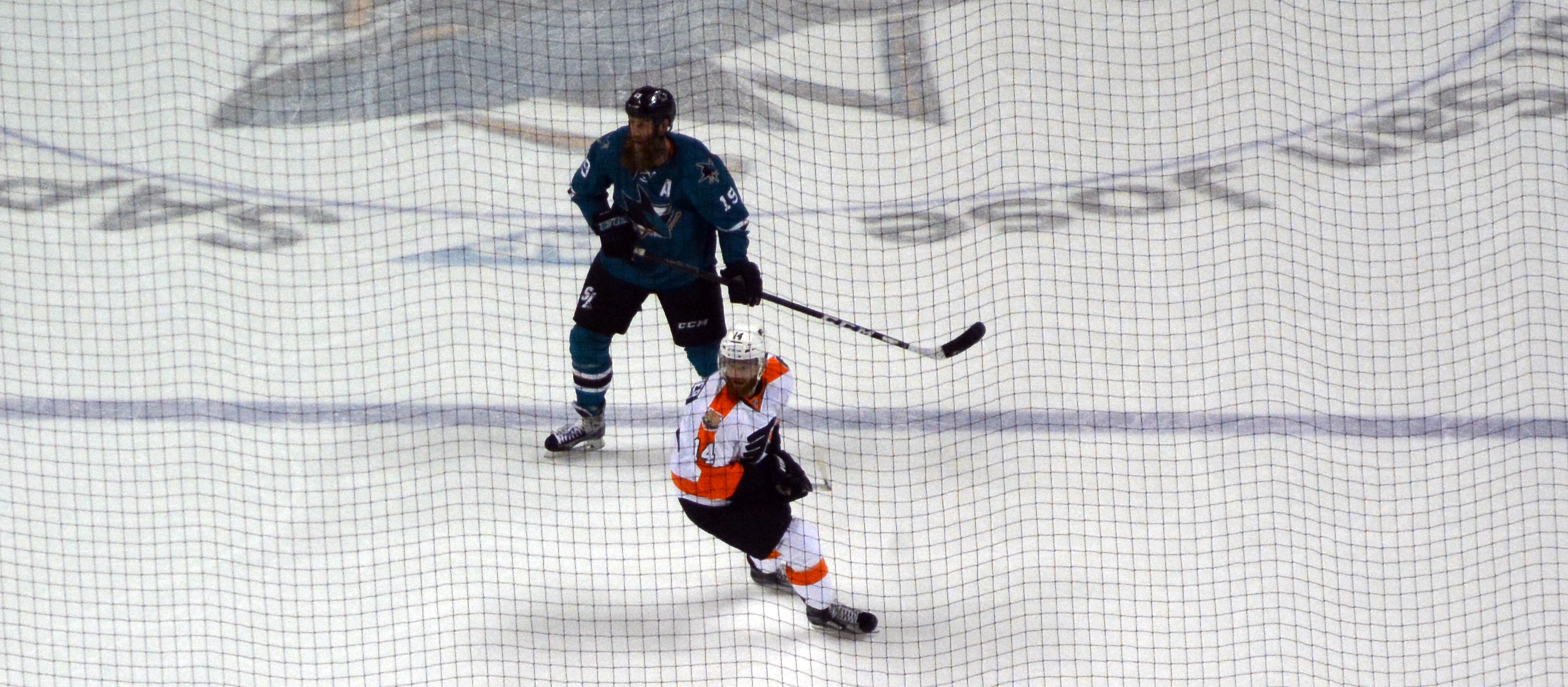
Couturier in a game against Joe Thornton in December 2016

Couturier suffered another major injury towards the beginning of the 2016–17 season. On November 22, 2016, during a game against the Florida Panthers, Couturier became entangled with Vincent Trocheck, and suffered a sprained medial collateral ligament (MCL) in his left knee. He began skating again in December, but could not rejoin the line-up until after the Flyers' Christmas break. When he did return, Couturier believed that he was not performing as capably, and was frustrated with underproduction both defensively and offensively. He found his stride on a line with Schenn and Dale Weise, putting up five goals and 12 assists between March 4 and April 9, and leading the NHL with a +18 plus–minus rating in the last month of the season. He finished the year with 14 goals and 20 assists in 66 games, and, although the Flyers did not make the playoffs in 2017, head coach Dave Hakstol was impressed with the Couturier—Schenn—Weise line, and intended to keep the trio together the following year.

Going into the 2017–18 season, however, Hakstol placed Couturier on the top line with Jakub Voráček and Giroux, the latter of whom was moved to the wing after a disappointing output the previous year. The new line helped Couturier find the offensive ability that had eluded him in previous seasons. In his first 19 games of the year, he scored 11 goals and 10 assists while playing with Giroux and Voráček. On March 20, 2018, while playing against the Detroit Red Wings, Couturier scored his 100th career NHL goal, becoming the seventh skater in the 2011 draft class to reach that milestone. At the end of the regular season, Couturier received three Flyers organizational awards: the Pelle Lindbergh Memorial Trophy for most improved player, the Yanick Dupre Class Guy Memorial Award for "character, dignity and respect for the sport both on and off the ice", and the Gene Hart Memorial Award, given to the "player who demonstrate[s] the most 'Heart'". He played in all 82 regular season games for the Flyers, doubling his previous career-high goal total with 31, and scoring a total of 76 points. Couturier's season performance made him a finalist for the 2018 Frank J. Selke Trophy, given to the best defensive forward in the NHL. He was the first Flyer to be named as a Selke finalist since Mike Richards in 2009. The award ultimately went to Anže Kopitar of the Los Angeles Kings.

During a team practice before Game 4 of the 2018 Stanley Cup playoffs, Couturier collided with his teammate Radko Gudas and needed to be aided off the ice. After missing Game 4, Couturier scored the game-winning goal in the last two minutes of Game 5, keeping the Flyers from elimination by the Penguins. He scored his second career hat trick in Game 6, but the Penguins took the game 8–5, buoyed by their own hat trick from Jake Guentzel, and the Flyers were eliminated from the playoffs. Couturier revealed, after the elimination game, that the collision with Gudas had torn the MCL in his right knee, and that, if the injury had occurred during the regular season, he would have been sidelined for four weeks. However, he chose to play through the injury to finish out the playoff series.

==== 2018–present ====
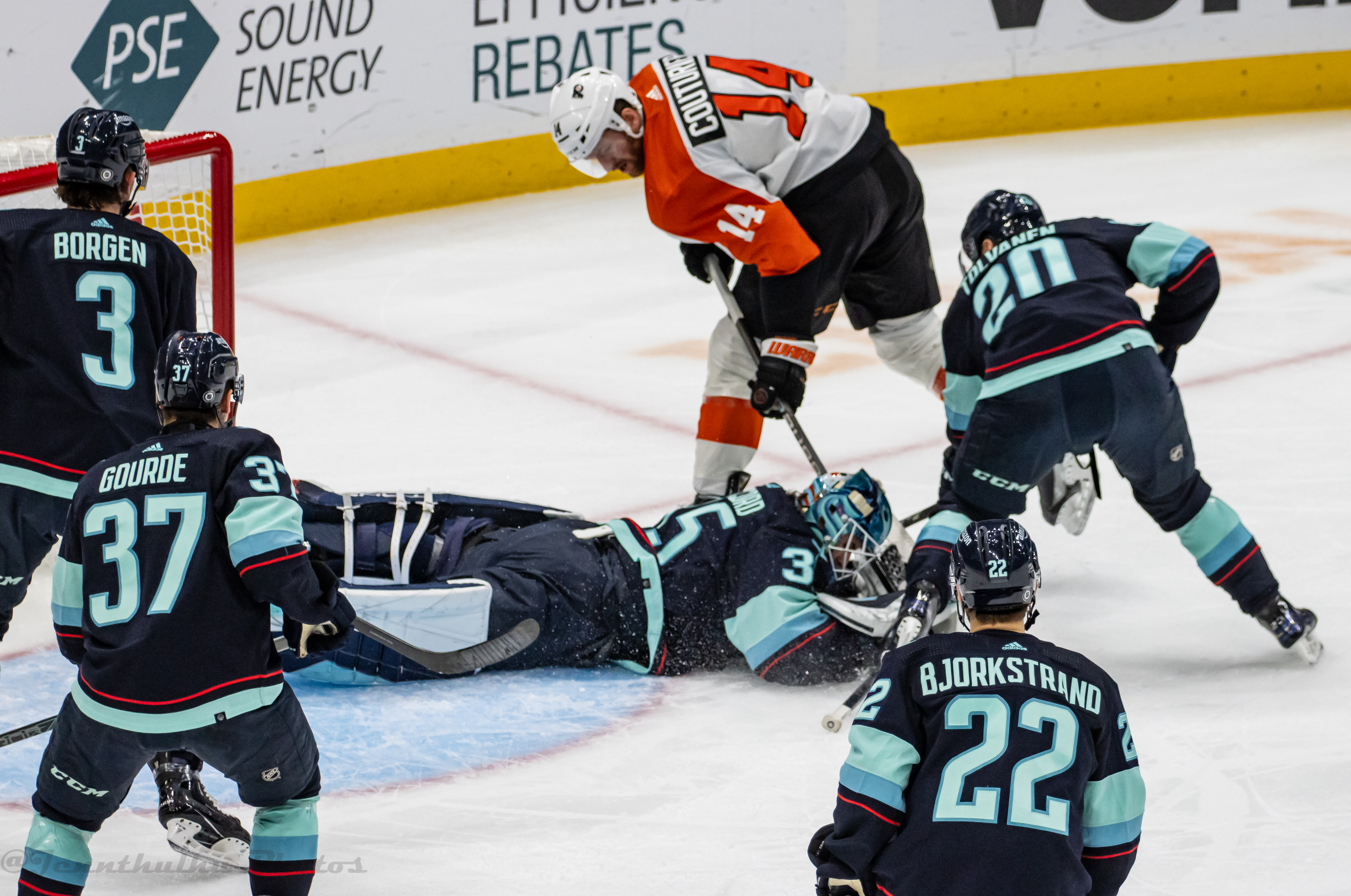
Couturier battling for puck control in December 2023

After sustaining a knee injury at a charity tournament that August, unrelated to the MCL injury that he had suffered earlier in the year, Couturier needed to miss a portion of the Flyers' 2018 training camp and preseason, but he was expected to return in time for the beginning of the regular season. On October 9, 2018, the Flyers announced that Couturier would serve as alternate captain for all home games during the 2018–19 season. He took over the role from Valtteri Filppula, who joined the New York Islanders during the off-season. Couturier had a slow start to the season, putting up only three goals in his first nine games. By late October, Couturier had found his stride, and returned to a line with Giroux and Konecny. After Hakstol was abruptly fired, however, interim coach Scott Gordon pushed Giroux back to centre, pairing Couturier with Voráček and rotating the third member of their line. On January 16, 2019, in a 4–3 victory over the Bruins, Couturier scored his first regular season hat trick. Coming the game after a similar effort from James van Riemsdyk, it was the first time that the Flyers had posted hat tricks in consecutive games since 2003. Couturier's steady production carried through the remainder of the season; by late March, he had passed 30 goals and 40 assists for the second season in a row. He finished the season with 33 goals and 43 assists in 80 games, and, at the end of the season, he took home the Bobby Clarke Trophy for the Flyers' most valuable player, as voted by sportswriters and sportscasters. He also won the Gene Hart Memorial Award for the second consecutive year.

Couturier began the 2019–20 season as one of three alternate captains for the Flyers, serving alongside Voráček, who took over the job in February 2019 after Wayne Simmonds was traded, and off-season acquisition Kevin Hayes. After noticing that pairing struggling players on a line with Couturier resulted in their improvement, new Flyers head coach Alain Vigneault began referring to the skater as "Dr. Coots". By the time that the NHL season was suspended indefinitely on March 12, 2020, due to the COVID-19 pandemic, Couturier had scored 22 goals and 59 points. He led the team with a +21 rating, and led the entire NHL with a 59.6 face-off percentage. When the NHL resumed for the 2020 Stanley Cup playoffs in Toronto, Couturier was one of 31 Flyers selected to play in the "bubble". He went scoreless in the first 10 playoff games, first against the Canadiens and then against the New York Islanders, before scoring against Semyon Varlamov in Game 2 of the Eastern Conference semifinals. The Flyers could not hold onto their 3–0 lead, however, and Couturier assisted Philippe Myers for the overtime-winning goal. Couturier missed Game 6 after spraining his MCL during a collision with Mathew Barzal, but returned for the Flyers' Game 7 shutout loss and playoff elimination.

Despite the playoff loss, Couturier won the Frank J. Selke Trophy on September 11, 2020, scoring 1424 points in the Professional Hockey Writers' Association ranked-choice vote. Patrice Bergeron, the runner-up, received only 884 points. Couturier was only the third Flyer in franchise history to receive the award, following Bobby Clarke in 1983 and Dave Poulin in 1987. He also took home the Bobby Clarke Trophy for the second year in a row.

Couturier was named as the Flyers' permanent alternate captain for the 2020–21 NHL season, with Ivan Provorov, Kevin Hayes, and Jakub Voráček serving as rotating alternates. On January 15, Couturier exited the second game of the pandemic-delayed season after only 45 seconds on the ice. It was revealed later that he had suffered a costochondral separation, in which one of his ribs tore away from the attached cartilage. He returned to the line-up on February 7, scoring two goals and one assist in the third period of a 7–4 win against the Capitals. Shortly after returning from his injury, Couturier was asked to push the Flyers forward when six of their forwards were placed on COVID-19 protocols. One player placed on protocols was Scott Laughton, and Couturier took his place on the line, centring James van Riemsdyk and Joel Farabee. Together, the trio put together five goals and 11 points in a span of three games. He missed another stretch of games in March due to a lower-body injury, which an MRI ultimately revealed was caused by a prior injury to Couturier's hip. Couturier ultimately played in 45 out of the 56 games in the shortened season, putting up 18 goals and 41 points. At the end of the season, he received the Bobby Clarke Trophy for the third year in a row, becoming the first player to do so since Eric Lindros in 1996.

On August 26, 2021, Couturier and the Flyers agreed to an eight-year, $62 million contract extension, which would go into effect during the 2022–23 season. Couturier incurred a number of minor injuries through the first half of the 2021–22 season – he was hit in the face with a puck on December 5 while the Flyers faced the Tampa Bay Lightning, and five days later, he required stitches on his wrist after being cut with a skate blade during a game against the Vegas Golden Knights. On December 31, general manager Chuck Fletcher moved Couturier to the injured reserve with an upper-body injury. On February 11, 2022, the Flyers announced that Couturier had undergone back surgery and that he would miss the remainder of the 2021–22 season. Fletcher told reporters that Couturier's back had started to bother him towards the beginning of the season and that nonsurgical options had not resolved the issue. At the time of the announcement, Couturier had scored six goals and 17 points in 29 games for Philadelphia.

Couturier sat out the entire 2022–23 season as a result of his back surgery. He was named the 20th captain in franchise history on February 14, 2024.

== International play ==
Medal record

Ice hockey

Representing Canada

World Championships
Gold medal – first place	2015 Czech Republic	
Silver medal – second place	2017 Germany/France	
Silver medal – second place	2019 Slovakia	

World Junior Championships
Silver medal – second place	2011 United States	

Ivan Hlinka Memorial Tournament
Gold medal – first place	2009 Břeclav and Piešťany	

Couturier's international hockey career began with back-to-back appearances for Canada Atlantic at the World U-17 Hockey Challenge in 2008 and 2009. His team finished eighth and ninth in the tournaments, respectively. In 2009, he also participated in the Ivan Hlinka Memorial Tournament, helping to capture a gold medal for Canada. In 2011, he became the only player under the age of 18 to be named to Team Canada at the World Junior Ice Hockey Championships. Although he had a solid performance, scoring three points in seven games, Couturier was largely overshadowed in the tournament by fellow prospects Brayden Schenn and Ryan Johansen. Canada won silver at the WJC, losing to Russia in the finals.

Couturier received his first Ice Hockey World Championships selection in 2015, where he posted three goals and four assists in 10 tournament games and helped take Canada to a gold medal. The following year, while still rehabilitating the shoulder injury that he had sustained during the Stanley Cup playoffs, Couturier represented Team North America at the 2016 World Cup of Hockey. Although Team North America did not advance to the semifinals, Couturier and his teammates were remembered for their speed and aggression during the tournament.

Couturier was one of five Flyers named to Team Canada for the 2017 IIHF World Championship, alongside Giroux, Simmonds, Schenn, and Konecny. There, Couturier played a critical role in Canada's semifinal comeback victory over Russia. Down 2–0 going into the third period, Mark Scheifele and Nathan MacKinnon scored on power plays before Ryan O'Reilly scored the go-ahead goal, with Couturier capping off the 4–2 win. Canada took silver in the tournament, following a shoot out loss to Sweden in the gold-medal match.

Both Couturier and his Flyers teammate Carter Hart first met their new head coach, Alain Vigneault, when he coached Team Canada at the 2019 IIHF World Championship. He scored one goal and three assists while serving on the defensively-minded second line, centreing Anthony Cirelli of the Tampa Bay Lightning and Sam Reinhart of the Buffalo Sabres. Couturier was also an alternate captain for Team Canada that year, assisting captain Kyle Turris alongside Las Vegas Knights forward Mark Stone. Canada took home the silver medal, after losing 3–1 to Finland in the gold medal match.

== Player profile ==
In the first part of his NHL career, Couturier was valued by the Flyers more for his defensive capabilities than for his point production. His reputation as a defensive forward began as a rookie in the 2012 playoffs, when his primary focus was to deflect Evgeni Malkin. Couturier's offensive ability only truly broke out in the 2017–18 season, when he was placed on the top line alongside Claude Giroux and Jakub Voráček. Since then, he has been a consistent point scorer for the Flyers, particularly on even-strength plays, and he has led all Flyers forwards in average minutes of play per game since 2017. Couturier's average time on ice dropped below 20 minutes in the 2019–20 season, as new head coach Alain Vigneault emphasized not overextending the Flyers' top scorers, but he continued to register above 2 points per 60 minutes of play.

== Personal life ==
Couturier was named after Sean Whyte, his father's first professional ice hockey roommate. He was given the middle name "Gerald" after his grandfather Gerald Couturier, a Quebec police officer who died several years before Couturier was born. Because he was born in the United States to Canadian parents, Couturier holds dual citizenship of the United States and Canada.

Couturier and his wife, Laurence Dionne, were married in June 2019. In 2020, they purchased a house in Haddonfield, New Jersey, for when Couturier's wife successfully acquires her green card. Couturier and his wife have two children.

The street outside of the K. C. Irving Regional Centre, the home arena for the Acadie–Bathurst Titan of the Quebec Maritimes Junior Hockey League (QMJHL), was renamed "Sean Couturier Avenue" in 2016. Couturier's father has been general manager for the Titan since 2005, and Couturier became a minority owner of the team in 2013.

== Career statistics ==
=== Regular season and playoffs ===
			Regular season					Playoffs
Season	Team	League	GP	G	A	Pts	PIM	GP	G	A	Pts	PIM
2007–08	Notre Dame Midget Hounds	SMHL	40	19	37	56	32	10	3	8	11	10
2008–09	Drummondville Voltigeurs	QMJHL	58	9	22	31	24	19	1	7	8	8
2009–10	Drummondville Voltigeurs	QMJHL	68	41	55	96	47	14	10	8	18	18
2010–11	Drummondville Voltigeurs	QMJHL	58	36	60	96	36	10	6	5	11	14
2011–12	Philadelphia Flyers	NHL	77	13	14	27	14	11	3	1	4	2
2012–13	Adirondack Phantoms	AHL	31	10	18	28	16	—	—	—	—	—
2012–13	Philadelphia Flyers	NHL	46	4	11	15	10	—	—	—	—	—
2013–14	Philadelphia Flyers	NHL	82	13	26	39	45	7	0	0	0	6
2014–15	Philadelphia Flyers	NHL	82	15	22	37	28	—	—	—	—	—
2015–16	Philadelphia Flyers	NHL	63	11	28	39	30	1	0	0	0	0
2016–17	Philadelphia Flyers	NHL	66	14	20	34	33	—	—	—	—	—
2017–18	Philadelphia Flyers	NHL	82	31	45	76	31	5	5	4	9	2
2018–19	Philadelphia Flyers	NHL	80	33	43	76	34	—	—	—	—	—
2019–20	Philadelphia Flyers	NHL	69	22	37	59	30	15	2	7	9	16
2020–21	Philadelphia Flyers	NHL	45	18	23	41	8	—	—	—	—	—
2021–22	Philadelphia Flyers	NHL	29	6	11	17	14	—	—	—	—	—
2023–24	Philadelphia Flyers	NHL	74	11	27	38	29	—	—	—	—	—
2024–25	Philadelphia Flyers	NHL	79	15	30	45	41	—	—	—	—	—
2025–26	Philadelphia Flyers	NHL	78	12	24	36	30	10	1	3	4	8
NHL totals			952	218	361	579	377	49	11	15	26	34

=== International ===
Year	Team	Event	Result	GP	G	A	Pts	PIM
2008	Canada Atlantic	U17	8th	5	0	1	1	2
2009	Canada Atlantic	U17	9th	5	5	4	9	4
2009	Canada	IH18	1st place, gold medalist(s)	4	2	2	4	2
2011	Canada	WJC	2nd place, silver medalist(s)	7	2	1	3	0
2015	Canada	WC	1st place, gold medalist(s)	10	3	3	6	2
2016	Team North America	WCH	5th	3	0	0	0	0
2017	Canada	WC	2nd place, silver medalist(s)	8	1	1	2	2
2019	Canada	WC	2nd place, silver medalist(s)	10	1	3	4	0
Junior totals				21	9	8	17	8
Senior totals				31	5	7	12	4

== Awards and honours ==
Award	Year	Ref
QMJHL
President's Cup Champion	2008–09	
Jean Béliveau Trophy	2009–10	
QMJHL Second-Team All-Star	2009–10	
Michel Brière Memorial Trophy	2010–11	
Michael Bossy Trophy	2010–11	
QMJHL First-Team All-Star	2010–11	
NHL
Frank J. Selke Trophy	2019–20	
Philadelphia Flyers
Pelle Lindbergh Memorial Trophy	2017–18	
Yanick Dupre Class Guy Memorial Award	2017–18	
Gene Hart Memorial Award	2017–18	
Gene Hart Memorial Award	2018–19	
Bobby Clarke Trophy	2018–19	
Bobby Clarke Trophy	2019–20	
Bobby Clarke Trophy	2020–21	

Awards and achievements
Preceded by Luca Sbisa	Philadelphia Flyers first-round draft pick 2011	Succeeded by Scott Laughton
Preceded by Ryan O'Reilly	Frank J. Selke Trophy winner 2020	Succeeded by Aleksander Barkov
Preceded by Claude Giroux	Philadelphia Flyers captain 2024–present	Incumbent
