= Canada Talks =

SiriusXM Canada Talks
- Canada
- Broadcast area: Canada; United States
- Frequency: SiriusXM 167
- Branding: SiriusXM Canada Talks

Programming
- Format: talk radio
- Affiliations: Business News Network, National Post

Ownership
- Owner: SiriusXM Canada

Technical information
- Class: satellite radio station

Canada Talks is a Canadian talk radio station, which airs on the satellite radio service SiriusXM Canada. The channel broadcasts talk programming, both original content and simulcasting of other broadcast services, relating to all aspects of Canadian life including business, politics, entertainment, lifestyle, health and sports.

The channel's daily morning program is National Post Radio, a collaboration with the National Post newspaper hosted by columnist Matt Gurney. Business programming on the channel is provided through simulcasts of Business News Network's programs Business Day, The Business News and Market Call.

Personalities who have been heard on the channel with original programming include Arlene Bynon, Shaun Proulx, Christine Bentley, Kate Wheeler, Sharon Caddy, Amber MacArthur, Eric Alper, Evan Solomon, Patrick Bateman, Liza Fromer, Vicky Sparks, Tara Slone and Kyle Buchanan.

The channel also broadcasts all Canadian Football League games, including the annual Grey Cup.
