= Jane Hawtin =

Canadian television and radio personality

Jane Hawtin is a Canadian television and radio personality. She has hosted programs on CBC Radio One, CFRB and Q107, including Metro Morning, Here and Now, As It Happens and the daily television talk show Jane Hawtin Live. She has produced several shows, including Jane Hawtin Live, Linehan, Prime Business with Deidre McMurdy, Caregiving with June Callwood, Road Scholars and The Link. She has worked extensively since 2004 producing programming for Aboriginal Peoples Television Network.

Hawtin was born in 1953 in Toronto Canada. She graduated in politics and drama from Queen's University. She started in radio news interviewing at CKLC-FM in Kingston, Ontario in 1977. Hawtin became the first female news director in private radio in 1980 for Q107 and in 1990, she became the first female talk show host in private radio on CFRB radio. "Hawtin got her foot firmly planted in the door with the weekend news, which she would write and read herself" biographer Susan Crean reports.

Since 1985, Hawtin has been president of her own production company, Amberlight Productions. In September 2009, she was also hired to do media training for the Canadian military.

In 2007, Hawtin was given the "Rosalie [Tremblay] Trailblazer Award Honouring Canadian Women in Broadcasting", and in 1998 she was nominated for a Gemini Award as Best Host/Interviewer.

In March 2014, Hawtin was appointed to the Ontario Court of Justice as a justice of the peace.
