= CHFI-FM =

Radio station in Toronto

- Toronto, Ontario; Canada
- Broadcast area: Greater Toronto Area
- Frequency: 98.1 MHz (HD Radio)
- Branding: 98.1 CHFI

Programming
- Language: English
- Format: Adult contemporary

Ownership
- Owner: Rogers Radio; (Rogers Media, Inc.)
- Sister stations: CFTR, CJCL, CKIS-FM, CFMT-DT, CITY-DT, CJMT-DT

History
- First air date: February 1, 1957
- Call sign meaning: Canada Hi-FI

Technical information
- Licensing authority: CRTC
- Class: C1
- ERP: 36,180 watts
- HAAT: 449 metres (1,473 ft)
- Transmitter coordinates: 43.67054°N 79.37962°W

Links
- Webcast: Listen live
- Website: chfi.com

CHFI-FM (98.1 FM) is a commercial radio station in Toronto, Ontario, Canada. Owned and operated by Rogers Radio, a division of Rogers Sports & Media, it broadcasts an adult contemporary format. The studios are in the Rogers Building on the northwest corner of Bloor and Jarvis Streets in Downtown Toronto. CHFI is often the most listened-to commercial radio station in Greater Toronto, according to the Numeris ratings.

CHFI-FM has an effective radiated power (ERP) of 36,180 watts. The transmitter is atop the CN Tower.

== History ==
=== Beautiful music ===
The station first signed on the air on February 1, 1957. It was initially owned by CHFI-FM, Ltd. CHFI was the first commercial FM outlet in Toronto to provide its own distinct programming rather than simulcasting an AM station. The call sign chosen to represent the words "Canada HiFI" or "high fidelity", providing a higher quality sound than on AM radio. CHFI also initially provided a special Muzak-like background audio service, playing soft instrumental music for offices and retail outlets in the city.

The station was acquired in 1960 by Aldred-Rogers Broadcasting, a forerunner to Rogers Radio. In 1962, an AM counterpart, CHFI (1540 AM) was added, which originally simulcast CHFI-FM's programming.

CHFI-FM pioneered the "beautiful music" format in Canada. The main programming heard from dawn until midnight was traditional easy listening fare, mostly instrumental cover versions of popular hits, as well as Broadway and Hollywood show tunes.

In 1972, CHFI's AM sister station, by this point under the CFTR call letters, abandoned the beautiful music simulcast of CHFI-FM and adopted a Top 40 format.

=== Popular programs ===
Music director Michael Compeau created a number of the station's much-imitated programs. The most famous was the popular and long running Candlelight and Wine heard evenings from 6 to 11 p.m. The program, hosted by Don Parrish, mixed soothing instrumentals, soft vocals and occasional light classical pieces in "pop" arrangements. The program spun off a series of best-selling record albums, many of which are now highly prized collector's items. Compeau also created the popular Classics 'til Dawn, an overnight program of popular classical music. (In 1984, Compeau would become program director of classical station CFMX-FM and use this same format for its overnight program.) Another of Compeau's innovations was Front Row Centre, heard Sunday afternoons at 2 p.m. This one-hour program featured full original cast recordings of popular Broadway musicals, with host Don Parish explaining the story between songs.

In the 1970s, Todd Russell began hosting a late evening program called Reminiscing featuring modern recordings of popular songs from the 1920s, 1930s, 1940s and 1950s. In 1973, Compeau decided to add some spice to the program by sprinkling in a few original period recordings. Since very few had been reissued on LP at this time, a call went out to collectors who loaned their original 78-rpm records to the radio station. The records were cleaned, repaired and brushed with distilled water before being transcribed to tape. Dubbed the "new library of old 78's", these antique rarities were showcased each weeknight. (In 1974, host Todd Russell died and was replaced by Sandy Hoyt.) CHFI soon amassed a collection of over 3,500 period recordings and the reminiscing program became one of the station's biggest successes. As time went on, the modern recordings were phased out and the program featured mainly the period recordings.

=== Adult contemporary ===
By the mid-1980s, the audience for CHFI and other beautiful music stations was beginning to age, while advertisers usually seek younger listeners. This led to the elimination of the specialty programs coupled with more vocals in the playlist. Eventually, CHFI eliminated nearly all instrumental music, and instituted a soft adult contemporary format. The transition worked, making CHFI one of the longest-running English-language adult contemporary stations in Canada.

In December 1987, Don Daynard became CHFI's new morning show host, a position he would hold until his retirement on December 10, 1999. Erin Davis joined the morning show in September 1988, with "Don and Erin" becoming one of Toronto's most prominent morning shows through the 1990s. Bob Magee took over Daynard's position on December 13, 1999.

A new logo was unveiled in 2000, when Rogers rebranded the station from CHFI FM98 and the "Toronto's Perfect Music Mix" slogan, to 98.1 CHFI, moving away from soft adult contemporary to mainstream AC under the "Toronto's Soft Rock" slogan.

In June 2003, CHFI, competing closely with rival adult contemporary station CJEZ, revamped their morning show to attract younger listeners. Firing Erin Davis and moving Bob Magee to afternoons, the station named Mad Dog and Billie, later known as "Jay and Billie", as the morning team, beginning June 23. Jay and Billie hosted mornings on co-owned Toronto station CISS-FM before it flipped to adult hits earlier that month. In addition, the station rebranded as 98-1 CHFI (pronounced, "ninety-eight-one CHFI"), and unveiled the "Today's Lite Music" slogan.

Bringing Jay and Billie on for mornings backfired on CHFI, as the station's ratings declined. In September 2004, Erin Davis was hired by CJEZ as a fill-in co-host, working alongside Mike Cooper. This brought CJEZ's ratings up dramatically, beating CHFI in several target audience demographics. In June 2005, CHFI management fired Jay and Billie, rehired Davis for mornings (who returned on September 6), and also hired Mike Cooper as her co-host on October 26 after his contract with CJEZ expired. At the same time, the station returned to using the point on the station's ID, returned to its soft AC format, and switched its slogan to "Toronto's Lite Favourites." This turned around CHFI's popularity, as the station reclaimed the top spot in the Toronto ratings, while CJEZ's ratings fell.

In 2009, CHFI returned to mainstream AC, but retained the "Toronto's Lite Favourites" slogan and added the decimal point back in the station identification (as "98.1 CHFI"). In addition, newer jingles were unveiled, along with an opening bumper for newer music. As well, some upbeat, rhythmic material was also added, while softer artists such as Air Supply were largely dropped from the station's playlist. On December 26, 2009, long-time competitor CJEZ switched from an adult contemporary format to an adult hits format as CHBM-FM, leaving CHFI as the only adult contemporary station in Toronto.

In late 2015, Mike Cooper announced his retirement, though would continue to host the classic hits-formatted "Coop's Classics" on Saturday nights. Darren B. Lamb, formerly with CHUM-FM, joined CHFI as Davis' co-host in February 2016. On November 9, 2016, Erin Davis announced she would be retiring from CHFI on December 15, and would be moving to British Columbia to be closer to her family. Lamb continued to host mornings, along with new co-host Maureen Holloway. On October 1, 2021, Maureen Holloway announced she would be leaving the station, with Lamb having had his last appearance earlier in the year (Lamb has since retired). The following week, Tracy Moore from co-owned television station CITY-TV began hosting the show on a temporary basis. On November 29, CHFI announced that Pooja Handa and Gurdeep Ahluwalia, formerly of CP24, would begin hosting mornings on January 4, 2022.

In January 2024, several months after joining Rogers as co-host of Breakfast Television on Citytv, Meredith Shaw launched the Sunday morning program The Feel Good Brunch, which will also air on other adult contemporary radio stations owned by Rogers across Canada. In March, it was announced that former MuchMusic VJ Rick Campanelli was joining the station as a weekday afternoon host. In 2025, Campanelli left CHFI to join Breakfast Television as a live-eye reporter, but will remain on the station as host of a Sunday program. Greg Burns, previously of sister station CKIS-FM, succeeded him in the weekday afternoon slot.

== Rebroadcasters ==
CHFI-FM can also be heard on these low-power transmitters:

=== British Columbia ===
Rebroadcasters of CHFI-FM
City of licence	Identifier	Frequency	RECNet	CRTC Decision
Granisle	VF2350	99.9 FM	Query	99-36
McBride	VF2305	105.1 FM	Query	97-156

=== Newfoundland and Labrador ===
City of licence	Identifier	Frequency	RECNet	CRTC Decision
Labrador City/Wabush	VF2050	99.1 FM	Query	87-864

== See also ==
- CFTR, originally CHFI
- Toronto Santa Claus Parade - CHFI is the official radio broadcaster since 1980s
