= Humble & Fred =

- Genre: Talk; Comedy
- Running time: 7:00 a.m. to 9:00 a.m., Monday through Friday
- Country of origin: Canada
- Home station: CHAM
- Hosted by: Howard "Humble" Glassman; Fred Patterson
- Starring: Show staff
- Created by: Howard "Humble" Glassman; Fred Patterson
- Original release: August 1989
- Opening theme: "Icky Thump" by The White Stripes "Straight Outta Compton" by N.W.A "Tighten Up" by The Black Keys
- Ending theme: "Where It's At" by Beck

Humble & Fred is a Toronto-based Canadian podcast, featuring co-hosts "Humble" Howard Glassman and Fred Patterson.

Available as a podcast since October 2011, the daily comedy-talk presentation was first launched over two decades earlier as a morning zoo commercial radio show that aired from 1989 until 2005 on three different Toronto-area corporate-owned radio stations: initially at CFNY-FM, where the show held significant market share throughout the 1990s and early 2000s during the station's "102.1 The Edge" alternative rock format, followed by moving to their corporate owner's newly rebranded AM talk radio asset Mojo Radio in 2001, and finally ending up on Mix 99.9 FM in 2003 before being cancelled two years later.

== History ==
=== Background ===
What would eventually become the Humble & Fred show was initiated in 1989 by the incoming CFNY-FM program director Danny Kingsbury, who—on behalf of the station's new corporate owner Maclean-Hunter—looked to stabilize CFNY's morning show situation that had been in flux ever since the long-running Pete n' Geets show went off the air in late 1987.

Once Pete n' Geets left, the vacated morning slot was taken over by the twenty-seven-year-old MuchMusic VJ Steve Anthony who began on December 14, 1987, by doing the morning drive time show in parallel with his music television job; due to a non-compete clause in his MuchMusic contract, in order to accept the CFNY offer, he had to obtain MuchMusic's permission. Different professional and personal factors—such as having to fill the beloved morning duo's shoes, choosing to devote more attention to his TV job than his radio gig, and maintaining a party lifestyle that on multiple occasions resulted in him missing work in the morning as well as facing the radio station's sudden switch to a Top 40 format—led to Anthony's relatively quick departure from CFNY by the end of 1988. A number of hosts were then given the CFNY morning slot, including Scot Turner and Randy Taylor, none of whom panned out either, which is when the newly arrived program director Kingsbury began seeking a more permanent solution.

CFNY's 1987-1989 morning show instability was just one of the many consequences of the station's ownership turmoil that also led to frequent management personnel changes, as well as tinkering with its on-air format throughout the same period. In August 1987, as part of its internal management structure realignment in preparation for the coming sale, the station's corporate parent Selkirk Communications (under control of its largest stakeholder, Southam Inc.) decided to move longtime program director David Marsden to the director of operations position. Taking over the PD post was his longtime deputy and on-air personality Don Berns (also known as DJ Dr. Trance), who was initially allowed to continue the "Spirit of Radio" concept that Marsden himself had largely created and fostered over the years. During fall 1987, Rogers Communications' Can$400 million bid for the takeover of Selkirk was accepted. However, due to being adjudged by the Canadian Radio-television and Telecommunications Commission (CRTC) to be holding an excessive number of FM radio assets as a result of the takeover, Rogers was ordered to divest the FM radio stations acquired from Selkirk in order to comply with Canada's media ownership concentration laws. Rogers thus placed CFNY in an escrow while looking for a third party buyer. During 1988, in an attempt to boost the ratings for achieving a better price ahead of the imminent sale spin-off, Marsden was released altogether while CFNY's alternative format playlists began to be injected with Top 40 hits. Simultaneously, on the personnel side, sales manager Jim Fonger was installed as the new director of operations to oversee the Top 40 switch. The Top 40 experiment began quietly over the 1988 Labour Day weekend, leading to acts like Taylor Dayne, Martika, and New Kids on the Block being rotated heavily. Within months, the entire playlist was filled with mainstream acts like Madonna, Michael Jackson, Bon Jovi, Janet Jackson, and George Michael, resulting in angry reaction from CFNY's listeners. The format change was officially announced in December 1988, with alternative music getting relegated to evenings and weekends; Berns resigned his program director duties shortly thereafter, though staying on as DJ. Even though the format change quickly led to station's overall listener ratings increasing from CFNY's average 500,000 to 700,000, this new audience was shown to be mostly composed of those who listen for very short periods of time that were thus of limited appeal to advertisers, as CFNY's market share dropped from 5.2% during fall 1988 to 4.6% in spring 1989. Since it failed to bring in new revenue, in addition to alienating CFNY's loyal listener base, the Top 40 experiment was discontinued by summer 1989, only seven months after implementation. Shortly prior, the sale of CFNY to the Maclean-Hunter conglomerate had been finalized, and the new owner ordered a return to the alternative format. Maclean-Hunter placed the station under its Key Radio division headed by Hal Blackadar, who immediately fired the inherited management, while bringing in radio broadcaster Reiner Schwarz to be the new director of programming and operations at CFNY. Schwarz hired Jamie Crookston as the new general manager, who, in turn, hired Danny Kingsbury as the new program director.

In summer 1989, when Kingsbury offered him the CFNY morning show in Toronto, twenty-nine-year-old radio DJ and comedian Howard Glassman had been working for a year at Montreal's Standard Broadcasting-owned CJFM-FM, hosting a program with Jeff Lumby. CFNY's original offer was for both Glassman and Lumby to move to Toronto to host the proposed Jeff & Howard Show—with an additional plan of attaching Fred Patterson as the sports guy, a role he had been performing on previous CFNY morning shows with Turner, Taylor, Anthony and even before that on Pete & Geets. However, at a meeting in Montreal during which Kingsbury and Jim Fonger presented the CFNY offer to Lumby and Glassman, it became apparent that Lumby wasn't willing to move to Toronto while Glassman called Kingsbury back to express interest in coming over by himself. Patterson was then flown to Montreal in order to be introduced to Glassman and to determine whether they mesh enough on a personal level to broadcast together on a daily basis. Soon after, the deal was made.

In addition to bringing in a new morning man, the station also promoted its overnight host Alan Cross by moving him to the afternoon drive time shift, and hired Dani Elwell as the new evening host Mondays through Thursdays from 8pm until midnight, giving her the freedom to musically program the last hour of her shift—named Alternative Bedtime Hour—as she pleased.

=== CFNY 'Toronto's Modern Rock' years (1989–1991) ===
The 5:30-9:30 a.m. morning drive time program began in August 1989 on CFNY-FM with Glassman as the sole host and Patterson as the sports anchor. In addition to comedy bits and musical numbers, the program featured two news and sports updates per hour. As the comedic banter between the host and sports anchor became an increasingly prominent feature of the show, Patterson was eventually promoted to full co-host. Another frequent on-air contributor was the show's producer Dan Duran, who, while simultaneously working at CFNY and Humble & Fred, also pursued side jobs as voice performer, TV personality, and aspiring actor.

The new morning show posted solid ratings from the get-go despite facing some opposition even from the station's staff, including the afternoon drive time host Alan Cross, who wasn't a big fan of Humble & Fred at the time. With the legacy of the "Spirit of Radio" concept looming large over CFNY, and especially with all the organizational turmoil the station had experienced over the two years since legendary program director and creator of "Spirit of Radio" David Marsden's 1987 removal, many of the remaining staff were intent on seeing CFNY continue to be run the way it had been under Marsden. They mostly saw the station's new morning man Glassman and his show as more examples of conventional corporate trends being injected into CFNY, generally treating him with contempt. Though Marsden's "Spirit of Radio" concept had officially been laid to rest—with CFNY FM 102 "Toronto's Modern Rock" now used in promos and playlists being rotated more often than before—the station still retained a lot of its old essence, playing The Pixies, New Order, and Depeche Mode while also championing the emerging Madchester scene as well as Nine Inch Nails' debut Pretty Hate Machine.

In 1990, CFNY program director Kingsbury was lured away by Western International Communications, taking the VP of programming position that put him in charge of CHOG (newly rebranded as 'AM 640 The Hog') and CFNY's main competitor Q107. Reiner Schwarz, who had already been performing the general manager duties as well due to Crookston being on long-term disability leave as a result of getting hit by a car, took over the vacant PD post at CFNY.

In May 1991, only a year and a half after taking the CFNY job, Glassman left the station for CKFM-FM, citing dissatisfaction with CFNY's overall organizational structure and the way it was being run day to day:

I wasn't really well received by the CFNY staff. It was weird for me because even though I was only 29, I had been in mainstream radio stations for almost 12 years already and I didn't really get and appreciate the way they did radio at CFNY. Over the years since then, I've had multiple epiphanies about what a gem that radio station I walked into in 1989 was. However, at the time, having no prior knowledge of the place, it didn't mean anything to me and I just thought the people were weird and their attitude towards radio was more free-form than what I understood. Working there day-to-day gave me a lot of anxiety about the decision I had made to come there because in my mind I was coming to a major market in Toronto to work at this big radio station and I now found myself working in a strip mall in Brampton where everyone's attitude was like 'hey man, let's play what we want.

Patterson remained at CFNY, getting paired with Skot Turner while Maie Pauts acted as the third voice on the newly launched show to replace Humble & Fred. Simultaneously, the station experienced a significant dip in the ratings—going from a 4.8% market share in spring 1991 to 3.1% in the fall of the same year. As the ratings showed no improvement in late 1991, a dramatic format change began to be considered, even switching to country, by station owner Maclean-Hunter. In late January 1992, one day ahead of the public release of the ratings book showing CFNY's further market share slide, Maclean-Hunter's top executive Hal Blackadar fired general manager Crookston and program director Schwarz. Simultaneously, the morning show setup was also dismantled, with Turner being fired and replaced with a temporary host alongside Patterson.

With the new Blackadar-installed management—general manager Vince DiMaggio and program director Stewart Meyers—CFNY responded to the commercial success of grunge; with emerging bands like Nirvana, Pearl Jam, and Soundgarden dominating the charts, the station decided to focus its alternative format on the American acts from this musical genre, along with a rebrand to "CFNY 102.1 The Leading Edge". The format change was accompanied with a large reduction in staff, either through resignations or layoffs, including departures of some well known on-air personalities such as Chris Sheppard, Lee Carter, and Dani Elwell. Dissatisfied with the changes at the station, Elwell famously resigned on the air in August 1992 followed by reading out her resume, while Carter wrote a scathing rebuke of the station's new direction from an insider's perspective that was published by a Toronto alternative weekly newspaper.

=== Humble returns to CFNY, 'The Edge' years (1992–2001) ===
At the end of 1992, only 19 months after leaving, Glassman returned to CFNY. His return was facilitated by Patterson, who had survived the layoffs, as well as the new general manager DiMaggio and program director Meyers, who sold Glassman on the idea of a new format despite him not originally being interested in going back.

Unlike the station's 1980s "Spirit of Radio" days under David Marsden, when no song would be played twice in a 24-hour period, the new format CFNY became a highly programmed station with current hit songs by popular acts like Nirvana, Pearl Jam, Soundgarden, Alice in Chains, Stone Temple Pilots, and Red Hot Chili Peppers in heavy rotation throughout the day, including in the morning during Humble & Fred. Jumping on the bandwagon of the rapidly emerging alternative rock and grunge musical genres, the station's new format became an immediate ratings winner, while the irreverent Humble and Fred morning duo was also proving a good fit. Not long after their late 1992 reunion, Humble and Fred introduced a bit called "Number 1 in '97", sarcastically announcing their intention of becoming "number 1" without really going into the specifics. Playing up their perceived underdog status while mocking their own supposed low ratings, it implored the audience to stay with the show because it was going to be number 1 by 1997, becoming the signature Humble & Fred bit for a few years. Another regular bit was 'The Humble Report', delivered by Glassman each morning as a funny five-minute take on the news.

By summer 1993, the show built a sufficient profile in Toronto that CFNY's main rival radio station Q107 approached the duo, offering a move for substantially more money. Glassman and Patterson accepted the terms in principle. However, once CFNY learned of Q107's offer, they matched it and Humble & Fred stayed. Years later, without specifically mentioning whether this is in jest or not, Humble talked on the air about doctoring Q107's offer by adding an extra Can$10,000 to it before showing it to CFNY, which they then matched.

With a group of interns like Danger Boy (Jason Barr) and Chicken Shawarma (Jeff Domet), both of whom would get regular on-air opportunities via promotional stunts, as well as the show's third voice Mary Ellen Beninger, who read news and traffic reports in addition to occasionally bantering with the guys, the morning zoo show was steadily gaining listeners among the 18 to 34 year old demographic. Humble & Fred producer Dan Duran, by now a fairly established Toronto radio and television personality, also frequently got on the microphone, adding to the show's popularity. Comedian Pete Cugno, also known as Scary Pete, was also associated with the show, recording comedic commentaries and satirical songs. At the time of his late 1992 return to CFNY, Glassman had already been part of The Dini Petty Show, a nationally broadcast daytime television program in Canada on CTV, making weekly appearances every Thursday in a comedically framed 5-8 minute segment titled 'Professional Husband'. The two shows, owned by different companies and aimed at completely different audience demographics, had no direct cross-promotion, but shared some of the staff including Humble & Fred producer Dan Duran, who simultaneously worked as the announcer on Dini. Furthermore, Glassman's Dini segments often contained mentions of the Humble & Fred radio show, including an entire segment on it in addition to featuring occasional un-credited appearances by Patterson. The weekly segment eventually ended in 1995.

In 1994, Duran left Humble & Fred after being promoted to co-host on Dini. Danger Boy (Jason Barr) took over the producing duties. Throughout the same year, Maclean-Hunter, the corporate conglomerate that owned CFNY, was in the process of being acquired by another large corporate entity, Rogers Communications. After being announced in late March 1994, the sale wasn't approved until December, with the Canadian Radio-television and Telecommunications Commission (CRTC) ordering Rogers, in accordance with Canadian media concentration laws, to sell off some of its newly acquired individual assets, including CFNY, to its competitor Shaw Communications. The station thus got its fourth corporate owner in just five years.

By fall 1995, Humble & Fred became the number one morning show in Toronto among the 18-to-34-year-olds with both males and females; however, on a suggestion from program director Meyers, they chose to ignore this information on air in order to continue with the popular "number 1 in '97" bit. In terms of total listeners, the market was dominated by Don & Erin on CHFI-FM. With his public profile increased, Humble began getting television offers that led to the performer joining Ed's Night Party, a weekly late-night comedy talk show that aired on Citytv, which he did in parallel with his daily radio morning show duties; however, his involvement with the program ended after only a season amid acrimony of feuding with its creator and star Steven Kerzner.

Humble & Fred was named as "the best morning show" in Canada in early 1997, an award given out by the Canadian Association of Broadcasters. Though never guest intensive, the show's increased profile brought more promotional guest segments with actors and musicians plugging projects aimed at the younger demographic, either via in-studio appearances or phone-ins.

With the highly publicized September 2, 1997 arrival of a multimillion-dollar-generating American syndicated radio juggernaut The Howard Stern Show to Toronto via CFNY's main rival, WIC-owned Q107, most players on the city's radio market—especially rock format stations aiming their content at young male demo—braced themselves for a loss of listeners they were likely to surrender to high-profile and raunchy Stern. Further hurting their cause was the fact Stern kept receiving a steady stream of free promotion through Canadian press and electronic media coverage of the controversy surrounding his arrival to the country—in addition to Toronto's Q107, The Howard Stern Show was simultaneously broadcast by Montreal's CHUM Limited-owned, English-language station CHOM-FM. Following a huge start ratings-wise along with a shocking one content-wise—featuring anti-French tirades and insults directed at Canada's Francophone population—that caused a lot of, mostly negative, press reaction throughout the country, Stern's Toronto numbers on Q107 stabilized, even somewhat sagged, by Christmas 1997. Still, he undeniably managed to establish himself as major player on the city's radio market, taking a significant chunk of Humble & Fred's audience in the process. In response, CFNY, which by this time was branded as "102.1 The Edge", hired the services of various radio consultants for the purposes of tweaking the show's content in order to better compete against Stern. As a result, Humble & Fred put together a listener contest consisting of scatological and/or otherwise disgusting tasks put before contestants competing for prizes ranging from $25,000 to a used car. Its popularity spawned a series of such contests on Humble & Fred throughout the late 1990s. By the June 1998 ratings book, Humble & Fred managed to recover most of the audience they lost to Stern, regaining their customary 4.7% of the overall market in Toronto after being pushed down to 3.5% the previous fall, when the newly arrived Stern dominated the ratings. Simultaneously, in the first four months of 1998, Stern lost twenty percent of his Toronto audience or 100,000 people (the majority of them being women), though he still retained significant market share with 8.9%, good for a third-place tie with CHUM-FM's Roger, Rick and Marilyn, and behind CHFI-FM's Don & Erin (11.7%) and CFRB's Ted Woloshyn (11.4%).

In 1998, Mary Ellen Beninger moved on to another station and was replaced by Sandra Plagakis. In 1999, Shaw Communications decided to carve out its media assets—including 102.1 The Edge, Q107, and Talk 640—into a newly created corporation called Corus Entertainment. In August 1999, the show sponsored a festival, "Humble & Fred Fest" at Toronto's Fort York.

=== Move to AM: Mojo 640 (2001–2003) ===
Humble & Fred remained with "102.1 The Edge" until April 2001, when they were reassigned to Mojo 640, another Corus Entertainment asset, while being replaced on "The Edge" by Dean Blundell, who was brought over from the Windsor market. Their move to Mojo 640 took place as part of its makeover from the old Talk 640, along with a heavily promoted re-launch that included a call letter change. Now marketed as "Talk Radio for Guys", the Toronto-area AM station ambitiously set about going after the 25 to 54 male demographic with a whole new on-air lineup that, in addition to Humble & Fred, included some well-known Toronto radio personalities such as John Derringer, Maie Pauts, Scruff Connors, and Spider Jones, and focused on "talk, sports, health and fitness, career and investment tips, gear, gadgets, cars, and sex". Jumping on the early 2000s lad culture bandwagon, the station looked to build an audience by catering to consumers of Maxim and FHM, high-circulation men's lifestyle magazines whose content relied on semi-nude women, cars, and sports. That being the case, Mojo's on-air personalities were encouraged to be risque and push the envelope. Corus further obtained radio broadcasting rights of Toronto Maple Leafs games, programming much of Mojo's schedule around them with added content such as analysis shows like Leafs Lunch.

Humble & Fred's particular move to the AM dial was initiated by Corus president John Cassaday, who had approached Glassman and Patterson in December 2000 at Corus' Christmas party to personally inform them of the company's plans to completely retool its AM asset Talk 640, offering them the re-launched station's morning slot as "a job that they could potentially do until retirement". Being 40 and 43 years of age at the time, respectively, Glassman and Patterson talked in later interviews about such line of thinking—youth-oriented "102.1 The Edge" perhaps no longer being the best fit for their show as they age into their 40s and a resulting feeling they'd have to leave it sooner or later anyway—resonating with them at the time as they pondered moving to a station targeting a bit older crowd. Their additional motivation in joining an AM talk station was a chance to broadcast without having to play 7-8 songs per hour, something they grew extremely frustrated with at "The Edge" over the years and ultimately unsuccessful in trying to get their bosses to scale back.

The show's producer Danger Boy (Jason Barr) parted ways with Humble & Fred by staying behind at "The Edge" where he was soon named co-host of the station's new morning program The Dean Blundell Show. Chicken Shwarma (Jeff Domet), who had spent 1997 and 1998 as an intern and associate producer with Humble and Fred, left the Live in Toronto daily music magazine show, which he had been producing for three years, to become the producer of the new Humble & Fred show at Mojo AM 640. Bingo Bob (Bob Willette), who had spent the previous three years as the show's associate producer, was promoted as Humble & Fred's new technical producer at Mojo 640.

However, the Mojo 640 move soon presented problems such as the station's entire schedule continuing to suffer from low ratings even after the much-publicized makeover and re-launch. Initial reviews of Humble & Fred in the new setting weren't stellar either, with William Burrill, a Toronto Star columnist who previously collaborated with Humble on Ed's Night Party, feeling that Humble and Fred were much better than the "early Mojo mould of jocks dumbing it down for 'da guys'", further quipping that "putting Humble Howard on the all-guy, sports-oriented radio station is kind of like putting Wayne Gretzky on a team that plays nothing but hockey's so-called neutral zone trap".

By fall 2001, Corus brought in famous radio executive John Hayes to become radio division president. Hayes reportedly wasn't a fan of the Mojo concept from the get go. A steady number of complaints over the station's tone and its basic 'men only' format resulted in the language being toned down, gradually leading to watering down of the on-air product. This trend particularly intensified after even the Maple Leafs president Ken Dryden complained to the station's management about several things said by Mojo on-air personalities. Though the station slightly improved the size of its target 25-to-44 demographic audience in the fall 2002 rating reports, it was still ranked only 16th in a 33-station Toronto market.

Glassman and Patterson can be seen in the 2003 documentary film Flyerman, which features footage of the duo broadcasting live to air at Mojo.

=== Back to FM: Mix 99.9 (2003–2005) ===
In August 2003, Humble & Fred, by then named Best Morning Show in Canada four times by the Canadian Association of Broadcasters, moved to Mix 99.9, a hot adult contemporary FM station owned by Standard Broadcasting, replacing Carla Collins, who had reportedly decided to leave due to finding it too difficult to continue doing a daily morning radio show alongside her television obligations. Meanwhile, back at Mojo, after Jeff Marek filled in initially, John Oakley would eventually become the duo's replacement at the AM station.

The Humble & Fred transfer from Mojo to Mix, one of several high-profile radio morning show changes in the Toronto market during summer 2003, received due coverage in Toronto-based print media including Mix program director Pat Holiday's quote about the duo's move being motivated by their desire "to be in the top echelon of morning shows with numbers and listeners", while Mojo's program director Scott Armstrong stated they left "due to being interested in a music format, which Mojo obviously couldn't offer". Years later, in different interviews, Glassman and Patterson talked about the details of their Mix transfer that were not public knowledge at the time, including a revelation that their primary motivation to move was Standard Broadcasting's offer of a 5-year guaranteed contract for each host, along with a significant pay raise and better bonus structure compared to what they were getting from Corus. They also discussed behind the scenes events during their unsuccessful contract re-negotiations with Corus that dragged throughout late 2002 and the first part of 2003 before Standard came in with its generous offer that they took, as well as Corus' last minute attempt to keep them, which the duo rebuffed having already signed with Standard.

Despite being back on the FM dial, whose dynamics they were well familiar with having had a successful program on an FM station, arriving at Mix 99.9, a station programmed around the pop-oriented format with a conventional and somewhat conservative listener base, required significant adjustment in their performance style that had prior to that generally been geared towards offbeat humour and risque conversations. Furthermore, Mix's promotional strategy included frequent lavish giveaways that Humble & Fred now had to participate in, thus further interrupting the show's flow. The station gave the duo a big promotional push that most notably included transit poster ads placed prominently on the Toronto subway.

Early into their run on Mix, after they were left without a news reader, the duo managed to lure Judy Croon, a stand-up comedian who also read news, weather, and sports on CFRB-AM (another Standard Broadcasting asset at the time) over to Mix 99.9 to be the newsreader during Humble & Fred, as well as the show's third voice.

However, the ratings were consistently tepid as it became clear that very little of their audience from "The Edge" and "Mojo" days followed them to "Mix", while they also had trouble attracting new listeners.

In August 2005, Patterson was relieved of his duties with "Mix" (though he remained under contract), with struggling ratings cited as a factor in the station's decision to shake up the show. When Patterson was released, there was significant curiosity about the true story behind the occurrence. Glassman was not able to say anything on the air, but he did offer contact information for his personal BlackBerry and readily invited those curious to contact him for the actual story.

==== Humble continues at Mix 99.9 without Fred (2005–2006) ====
The show was re-billed as the Humble Howard Morning Show with Judy Croon as the new co-host and producer Bingo Bob. However, less than a year later in July 2006, Humble was let go and the show was removed from Mix 99.9's schedule due to poor listenership. After Steve Anthony filled in on a temporary basis, Mad Dog and Billie took over the slot on a permanent basis on August 8, 2006.

After reuniting for a Christmas show podcast in 2006, their first time on-air together since being separated in August 2005, Glassman and Patterson continued the practice of occasionally reconvening for one-off podcasts. The initial podcasts were recorded at former producer Dan Duran's house, before deciding to do one as a small event on location with special guests and a live audience — their May 2009 podcast at Dominion on Queen pub, celebrating the 20th anniversary of Humble & Fred going on air with guests Nick Kypreos and Tyler Stewart of Barenaked Ladies. Altogether, eight podcast shows were recorded and released between 2006 and 2010.

=== The Christmas show tradition ===
One of Humble & Fred annual traditions on terrestrial radio was its "Gift of Christmas" show. Broadcast live from location, usually a downtown Toronto hospitality establishment, multiple Christmas shows were done from the Horseshoe Tavern while the last few were held in the Courthouse restaurant. Longtime performers on the Christmas shows included the Doo Wops comedy group, and various members of Barenaked Ladies.

The last Christmas show on terrestrial radio took place without Patterson on December 23, 2005. One year later, when neither Humble nor Fred were on radio anymore, the 17th annual Humble & Fred Christmas Show was held and recorded at former producer Dan Duran's house on December 16, 2006, and subsequently made available from the duo's website as a free podcast. In December 2010, now employed at different radio stations, the duo reconvened to do another Christmas show, this time at the studio of Toronto's 103.9 Proud FM, that was again released as a free podcast.

=== Re-launch on the internet (2011–present) ===
On October 15, 2011, more than six years removed from the last time they were on the air together (other than the occasional one-off joint podcast in the meantime), Humble and Fred re-launched the daily show, this time distributed online as a podcast. Their reunion occurred in the wake of both their recent individual dismissals from terrestrial stations—Humble had been let go from his morning show job at Boom 97.3 in Toronto earlier that year in April 2011, while Fred was released from Peterborough's The Wolf 101.5 in July 2011 where he had been working behind the scenes as program director. Now producing daily content in a stripped-down podcasting operation they launched by reportedly investing only Can$3,500 in equipment with initially no paid employees other than themselves and a business model based on keeping costs low, Humble and Fred stated from the start that they would welcome a return to a corporate-owned commercial radio entity. To that end, the duo made a conscious decision to approach their daily internet podcast the same way they produced their morning show on corporate radio for 16 years, which entailed renting a space to create the podcast from as opposed to doing it from either one of their homes, converting the said space into a makeshift studio, and striving for broadcast-quality daily content that could potentially be played on radio.

Soon after launching, the addition of Bill Herz, recently retired former vice president of sales for Standard and Astral Radio and the duo's good friend, to the podcast in consulting capacity was announced. His work on the show mostly involves selling advertising spots via a personal network of contacts he managed to develop in the business over the years and his compensation is commission based. The podcast also began providing unpaid internships for a school credit, mostly to radio and television students at Greater Toronto Area post-secondary institutions. One intern, Phil Hong, eventually was added to the paid staff as a technical producer.

Barely a few months into their podcasting, the duo's limited return of sorts to terrestrial radio was announced via a deal with Rogers Media that saw their podcast being promoted on 19 of the company's radio stations' websites across the country, and on the stations themselves as well as on Rogers' smartphone app. It came about via Rogers Media executive Julie Adam who, having been a fan of the duo's previous work, reached out to them and eventually agreed on the deal that she referred as company's "experiment with digital content".

==== Returns to terrestrial radio: Kingston's K-Rock (summer 2012) and Astral Media late night slot (2013–2015) ====
In June 2012, Humble & Fred joined K-Rock 105.7, a Rogers Media-owned station from Kingston, Ontario, to fill in its morning slot for the summer. Though now commencing production of a 6-9 a.m. terrestrial radio morning show for the Kingston market, they also continued with their daily internet podcast. Glassman and Patterson did their K-Rock 105.7 show from Toronto rather than moving to Kingston, which aroused some controversy in Kingston's local print media.

In January 2013, the duo announced a deal with Astral Media for a late-night terrestrial radio comedy show, featuring a mix of their new and previously podcasted material. As part of the deal, the duo additionally got to do guest segments on Astral's various properties such as John Moore's morning show on Newstalk 1010 and John Tory's afternoon drive time program Live Drive on the same station. The new late weeknights 12-2 a.m. program—a cleaned up version of their daily 2-hour podcast with profanity taken out and reformatted into four 25-minute bits that can be played with terrestrial station breaks in-between—began airing on January 21, 2013, on Astral's two comedy-format radio stations (Funny 820 in Hamilton and Funny 1410 in London) as well as on Newstalk 1010 in Toronto. Potential expansion via syndication to other stations was also announced, and within weeks they were added to the Newstalk 610's (another Astral station, serving Niagara Region) nightly schedule from 10pm until midnight.

By July 2013, Astral was bought by Bell Media and the arrangement continued under the new ownership.

==== Expansion to satellite radio: SiriusXM Canada (2013–2018) ====
On May 7, 2013, Humble & Fred were announced as the new 7 a.m. morning show on SiriusXM Canada's newly re-branded "Canada Laughs" channel that had been known as "Laugh Attack" up to that point. They began two days later on May 9 as a two-hour live weekday morning broadcast. The new deal put the duo in a unique position of being on three different platforms every day—first broadcasting their daily 2-hour show live on satellite radio every morning, then making the same content available as a podcast followed by having the altered version of the same content air that night on AM terrestrial radio. Soon after getting on satellite, the show added Eileen Ross (formerly with Rogers Media where Humble and Fred had collaborated with her on promotional material as part of their Rogers deal) as a third on-air voice while her duties also involved booking guests.

In late April 2014, Humble & Fred got into a mini-controversy with Sirius XM show, Opie and Anthony. The Canadian pair relayed a story on the air about listening to Opie and Anthony and not finding them funny. This caused a mainly one-sided mini-brouhaha as Humble and Fred got mentioned on the O&A panel discussion during the American duo's May 23, 2014 show. As a result, Opie & Anthony's fans (known as "pests") overloaded Humble & Fred's website and Facebook page. Glassman and Patterson would clear the air later that week by retelling and contextualizing the story with added information. Notably that they had listened to Opie & Anthony during a late 1990s trip to New York City with a radio consultant to monitor other morning radio shows in anticipation of Howard Stern entering the Toronto market. They went on to say that their boss had referred to O&A as "not funny, but fun." The four morning radio hosts made up on O&A's May 28, 2014 show when Glassman and Patterson called into O&A to discuss the misunderstanding, morning radio, and the city of Toronto.

The show celebrated its 25th anniversary with an event at the Horseshoe Tavern that aired live on SiriusXM Canada starting at 8pm on November 5, 2014, featuring numerous guests, including the newly inaugurated Mayor of Toronto and the duo's former radio colleague John Tory and Hockey Night in Canada's recently hired new host George Stroumboulopoulos.

After airing for two and a half years, the nightly AM radio show that came about as part of the content licensing deal with Astral Media was canceled in July 2015, with Toronto's Newstalk 1010 putting Art Bell's Midnight in the Desert in the timeslot.

In early June 2016, after performing as the show's third voice for three years, Eileen Ross was released. Her exit was announced by co-hosts Humble and Fred midway through the June 6, 2016 show without providing further details beyond labeling it part of the show's "re-positioning". After some negative listener reaction, they further discussed her departure the next day live on air in an 11-minute segment, stating they're doing so despite originally not planning on addressing the reasons they're no longer working with Ross "out of wanting to be discreet, sensitive, and empathetic". Without going into specifics, they further stated that a lot went into the decision, including "personal issues and circumstances" and "their desire to take the show into a slightly different direction by concentrating on some Humble & Fred hallmarks that involve just Humble and Fred". Amanda Barker, who had been stepping in for Ross in the two years prior, became the third voice and producer from 2016 - 2019. The show was taken off SiriusXM Canada's schedule in May 2018 as part of the rebranding of their Canada Laughs channel into "Just for Laughs Radio".

==== Back on live terrestrial radio in the GTA: Funny 820 (2018–2021) ====
On September 17, 2018, Humble & Fred began airing weekday mornings on Funny 820, a Bell Media-owned AM station based in Hamilton, Ontario, with the same material made available for download/streaming as a podcast shortly after the end of the daily live show. A continuation of the same type of business arrangement they had previously agreed with SiriusXM Canada, the Funny 820 content-licensing deal also saw the duo carried live—this time on terrestrial radio—without direct monetary compensation, but having their four hourly live reads of podcast sponsor ads aired on an extra platform, and thus potentially increasing their revenue by getting an opportunity to charge more for those spots. The 7-9a.m. daily live broadcast, with two 5-minute breaks per hour so that the station could insert local traffic and weather, also represented a bit of a milestone for the duo, marking their return to live terrestrial broadcasting in the Greater Toronto Area region for the first time after thirteen years since the show's 2005 cancellation at Mix 99.9.

The show was also carried by 88.7 The River from Mount Forest, Ontario in addition to its cut-up segments re-airing during weekends on Newstalk 1010 in Toronto. At the time of joining the Funny 820 morning schedule in 2018, the Humble & Fred podcast audience reportedly averaged between 12,000 and 15,000 downloads per day.

As part of the February 2021 Bell Media layoffs that saw the corporation cut hundreds of radio and television jobs across Canada, Funny 820 informed the duo of its decision to end the Humble & Fred content-licensing deal, setting April 10, 2021 as the last day the station will carry the show. In response, on February 18, 2021, Humble & Fred quit the radio station live on air near the end of the show. Concluding that the podcast had gained enough of an audience along with a steady number of sponsors over the years, the duo decided to go on only as a podcasting operation.

==== Podcast only ====
Beginning February 22, 2021, Humble & Fred is available only as a podcast for download/streaming through podcast aggregator platforms as well as live on their Facebook page every morning at 7:30 a.m. EST. The duo simultaneously created a Patreon account, soliciting monthly donations from their audience.

== Show staff ==
=== Current ===
- "Humble" Howard Glassman (co-host 1989–2005, 2011–present)
- Fred Patterson (co-host 1989–2005, 2011–present)
- Phil Hong (intern 2011, technical producer 2012–present)
- Toronto Mike (Mike Boon) (producer 2019–present)

=== Former ===
- Mary Ellen Benninger (news and traffic 1989–1998)
- Dan Duran (producer 1989–1994)
- Marla West
- Scary Pete (Pete Cugno) (writer, contributor 1994–2001)
- Danger Boy (Jason Barr) (intern 1993–94, producer 1994–2001)
- Chicken Shwarma (Jeff Domet) (intern 1997, associate producer 1998, producer 2001–2003)
- Bingo Bob (Bob Willette) (intern 1997–98, associate/technical producer 1998–2003, producer 2003–05)
- Sandra Plagakis (news and traffic 1998–2001)
- Todd Shapiro (intern 1999–2001)
- Kelly Cutrara (third voice 2011–13)
- Jason Kinder (producer 2011–2012)
- Eileen Ross (producer 2012–2016, third voice / show booker 2013–16)
- Amanda Barker (producer / third voice/ producer 2016–2019)
