= Hainsworth =

Hainsworth is a surname. Notable people with the surname include:

- George Hainsworth (1893–1950), Canadian ice hockey player
- Herb Hainsworth (1881–1955), Australian rules footballer
- Zarin Hainsworth (born 1959), British women’s rights activist
- Isis Hainsworth (born 1998), Scottish actress
- Michael Hainsworth, Canadian business reporter
- Sarah Hainsworth (born 1967), British university administrator
