= Todd Shapiro =

Canadian business executive and former radio broadcaster

Todd Shapiro is a Canadian business executive, entrepreneur and former radio broadcaster. He is the co-founder, chief executive officer and a director of Rhelion Life Sciences, formerly Red Light Holland Corp., and is chief executive officer and a director of Filament Health. Shapiro previously hosted The Todd Shapiro Show on SiriusXM Canada's Canada Laughs channel and was a regular fill-in host on TSN 1050.

== Early life ==
Shapiro was born to a civil servant father and teacher mother in Toronto, Ontario. During his podcast, Shapiro stated that his parents provided him with a wonderful upbringing, but taught him little about business, which contributed to his decision to pursue the arts. He graduated with a sociology diploma from York University, followed by working at a heating, ventilation and air conditioning business. At age 26, Shapiro returned to school, enrolling in Seneca College's radio and television program.

== Career ==
=== Business career ===
Shapiro co-founded Red Light Holland Corp., a publicly traded company operating in the psychedelics sector, and has served as its chief executive officer and a director. In 2026, following Red Light Holland's acquisition of Filament Health, the company was renamed Rhelion Life Sciences Corp..

Following the acquisition, Shapiro became chief executive officer and a director of Filament Health. Filament is a psychedelic drug development company focused on naturally derived drug candidates.

Filament's intellectual-property portfolio includes 76 issued patents across 15 patent families relating to natural psilocybin and methods including extraction, purification, standardization and stabilization.

Its lead drug candidate, PEX010, is a standardized botanical psilocybin formulation developed by Filament. PEX010 has been supplied for clinical and academic research internationally.

PEX010 has been used in clinical research involving several psychiatric and neurological indications. In 2024, the Food and Drug Administration and Health Canada authorized a Phase 2 clinical trial of PEX010 for methamphetamine use disorder.

Filament has also supplied PEX010 to academic research programs in Canada and internationally. In 2026, reported research programs involving PEX010 included studies in palliative care, bipolar II depression and healthy-adult mechanism research, as well as research at the University of California, San Francisco.

== Career ==
Shapiro's first experience in the entertainment business came as a reality contestant on Blind Date (hosted by Roger Lodge) in 1999 when the American show had come up to Toronto to film 5 episodes, choosing their "daters" via CityTV's "Speaker's Corner" booths. Over 10,000 people auditioned for spots, but 27-year-old Shapiro, a student at Seneca College's radio/TV program, stood out enough for the show's producers to call him back shortly after he recorded his video.

When the Blind Date footage, that had been shot in July 1999, was to air on CityTV in November 1999, Shapiro was invited to discuss his Blind Date experience on Humble & Fred, a morning show on 102.1 The Edge radio station that had a commercial tie-in with CityTV via having the Toronto Blind Date couples as guests on the morning of their respective episodes' scheduled air dates. Shapiro came alone on the Humble & Fred show since his date had moved to Ottawa in the meantime. After his first ever in-studio, on air experience, Shapiro approached "Humble" Howard Glassman and asked to be his intern to help him get experience and fulfill the 100 hours he needed in order to graduate from his college program. Humble reportedly replied, "Come back tomorrow".

=== 102.1 The Edge ===
Interning at Humble & Fred, Shapiro was part of various promotional stunts, occasionally contributing with written material. He stayed with the show until his last day of school 20 April 2001; coincidentally at the same time, the show got reassigned to Mojo 640, an AM Toronto station also owned by Corus Entertainment that functioned as 102.1 The Edge's sister entity.

Upon completing his Humble & Fred internship, Shapiro continued working at The Edge in their promotions department where he met Dean Blundell, 102.1 The Edge's new acquisition from the Windsor market, brought in to host his own The Dean Blundell Show — station's morning zoo replacement for Humble & Fred. Telling Blundell about his desire to get on air, Shapiro would soon get that opportunity.

==== The Dean Blundell Show ====
Performing alongside Jason Barr (another holdover from the Humble & Fred show where he had worked as producer after also starting out as intern, performing promotional stunts in fake Scottish accent under the Danger Boy pseudonym), Shapiro became one of Blundell's two sidekicks. The station also had Sandra Plagakis periodically coming on throughout the morning to read news and traffic reports and the three show hosts would occasionally engage her in a conversation. Shapiro's primary role on the show entailed coming up with daily content mostly through puerile and occasionally outrageous behaviour; often referred to as ReTodd on the air, his signature segment 'Todd on the Street' involved talking to homeless people on the streets of Toronto in a manner many found to be malicious, offensive, and exploitative. His other notable moments from the show had him visiting his grandmother in her old-age home live on air for a round of juvenile questions about her sex life, walking around Union Station wearing only an adult diaper, and sneaking into Toronto hotels to pound on rival hockey players' doors at 6 a.m. before games against the Toronto Maple Leafs.

In August 2010, after Barr got released via not having his contract renewed, Shapiro assumed a bigger role on the show with expanded hosting duties while Derek Welsman a.k.a. Blind Derek (who had previously during mid 2000s been involved with the show, gaining some notoriety as Derek the Blind Movie Reviewer) got added as replacement for Barr.

Shapiro worked at 102.1 The Edge from 1999 until 2013. On 24 July 2013, Blundell announced that Shapiro would no longer be with the show without any further explanation to the sudden and unexpected news. After the announcement, 102.1 The Edge's Twitter and Facebook accounts were blasted by angry fans who wanted to know what happened with Shapiro's position at the radio station and demanded his return. An official explanation was never given but within months of Todd Shapiro departure from the Dean Blundell Show, 102.1 The Edge announced the show's cancellation in early January 2014, after having put the show on hiatus in mid-December 2013.

=== SiriusXM The Todd Shapiro Show ===
In January 2014 Humble Howard and Fred Patterson announced during their show on SiriusXM Canada's Canada Laughs channel that Todd Shapiro would be getting his own one hour 9 AM show following Humble & Fred's two-hour slot in the morning.

Shapiro's show, entitled The Todd Shapiro Show, launched on 3 March 2014. One of his first bits on the new show was a discussion with a parody of Apple's Siri which asked him questions about his sudden departure from 102.1 The Edge. During the discussion about the situation, Shapiro did not go into many details and kept it all as polite and general as possible.

In June 2014 it was announced by SiriusXM Canada's program director Joe Thistel that due to its early success, The Todd Shapiro Show would have its running time expanded to 2 hours along with a move to the "drive home" 4–6 p.m. time slot on weekdays.

==== Scott Weiland interview ====
Shapiro interviewed Scott Weiland in late November 2015 live over the phone on The Todd Shapiro Show. This interview turned out to be Weiland's last live on-air interview. TMZ, Billboard, BlabberMouth.net, Radar Online, Entertainment Tonight Canada, CP24, and CTV National News all featured Shapiro's interview with Weiland as this was the last time the public would hear from Weiland before his death on 3 December 2015.

==== Yuk Yuk's ====
In October 2017 Shapiro premiered his new Comedy Show called Comedy Virgins at Yuk Yuk's in downtown Toronto. The premise is to allow a first timer to get on a stage to break their "Comedy Virginity".

==== Dart Guy and Todd Shapiro ====
Later in 2017, Shapiro announced his collaboration with "Dart Guy," a Toronto Maple Leafs fan, for a TSN1050 radio show.
