= Mushy Callahan (band) =

Canadian indie rock band

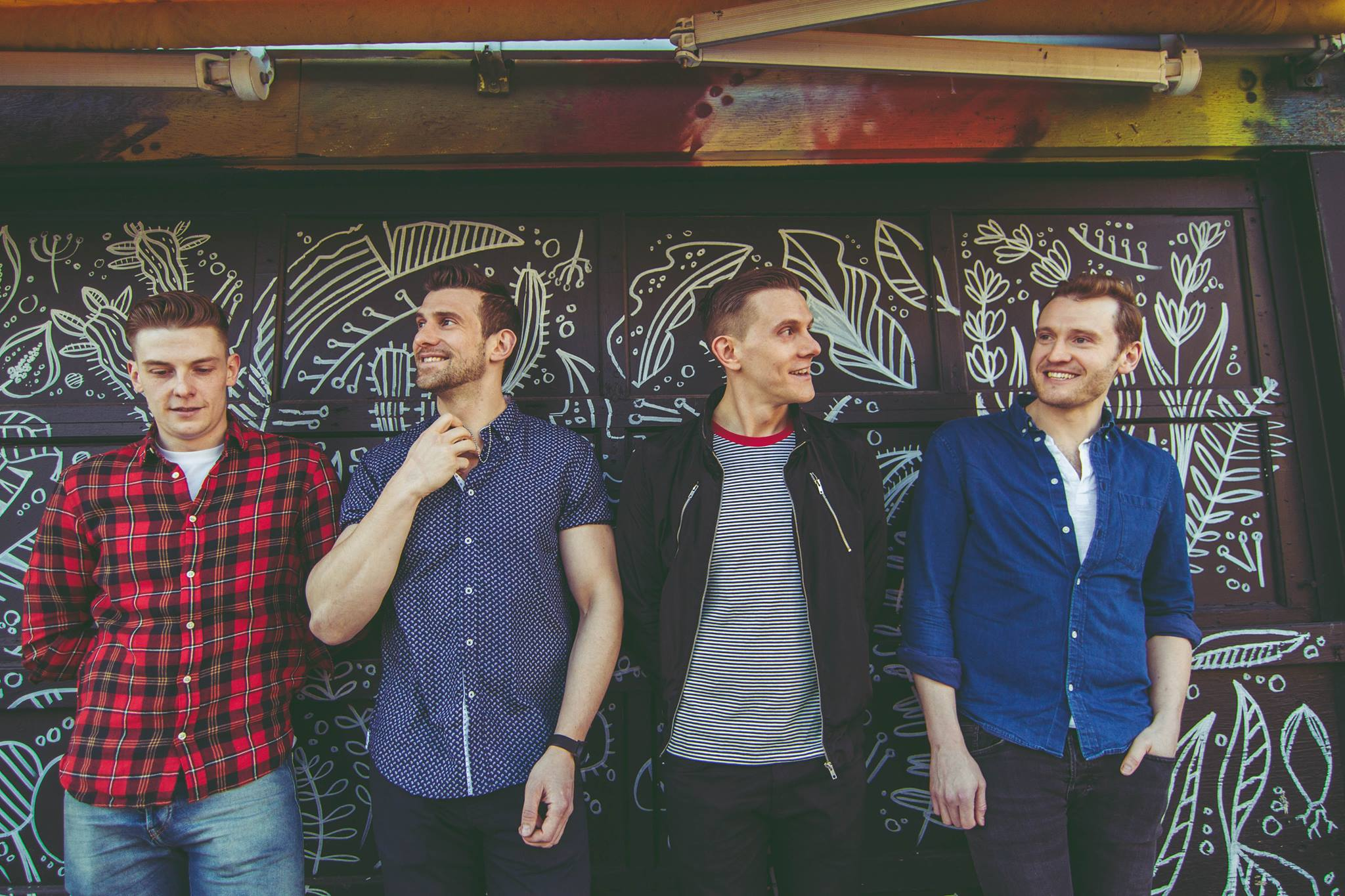

Background information
- Years active: 2010–present
- Members: Jacob McCann, Joel McCann, Lucas McCann, Noah McCann
- Website: mushycallahan.com

Mushy Callahan is a Canadian indie rock band based in Toronto, Ontario, Canada. The band's lineup consists of four members: Lucas (guitar, keyboard, backing vocals), Joel (drums, backing vocals), Noah (guitar, vocals) and Jacob McCann (bass guitar, backing vocals) and has remained constant since the band became active in 2010. All of the band members are brothers from a small town in Northern Alberta called Peace River.

== History ==
Mushy Callahan received an arts development grant in 2011 from the Ontario Arts Council, and the band's debut EP album, Man on the run, was released that year. It was recorded in Mike Turner's The Pocket studios in Toronto. The album was reviewed by newspaper, radio, and music critics. and is in the top-60 international videos on the international popular-music vlog, BalconyTV. The reviews were mainly, but not all, positive. They won the Indie Online Band of the Month contest at 102.1 The Edge CFNY-FM and in London on FM96 CFPL-FM.

The band completed a Western Canada tour and was showcase in Edgefest during the summer of 2012. They performed at a daytime venue at the Toronto North by North East (NXNE) Festival. Shortly after, they released a music video for the single "Shot Down" with City TV news anchor Tom Hayes.

Mushy Callahan recorded their debut, full-length album in 2013; it was released in September of that year, and was titled The Makings of a Man. They also performed once again as part of the 2013 NXNE Festival.

In 2014 the band again toured Western Canada. In 2015 they performed for a third time as part of the NXNE festival and PeaceFest in Peace River in support of their album "Makings of a Man," as part of a touring run of a dozen shows across Canada from Vancouver to Quebec. They are most well known for the single "Weathered Eyes," which charted at 69 on Canadian Billboard Radio and the music video was featured on AUX.TV, CMT and MUCH as well other smaller local TV stations. Mushy Callahan's success has continued through 2018 with their release of the album "Revelations," which highlights the singles "Deep Meadow" and "End of my Rope". The album has widely been well received by independent music reviews.
