= Martin Streek =

Canadian radio DJ (1964–2009)

- Born: June 16, 1964; Toronto, Ontario, Canada
- Died: July 6, 2009 (aged 45)
- Occupations: Radio DJ, Producer, Host, Voice Over Announcer

Martin Streek (June 16, 1964 – July 6, 2009) was a Canadian radio DJ known for his work on CFNY-FM (102.1 the Edge) in Toronto, Ontario. His on-air duties included hosting the Thursday 30, live-to-air from the Phoenix nightclub, and live-to-air from the Velvet Underground. He died by suicide on July 6, 2009.

== Youth ==
Streek grew up in the Credit Woodlands and Sheridan Homelands part of Mississauga, Ontario. He attended Ellengale PS and Thornlodge Public School (to 1976), Homelands Senior Public School (to 1978), and Erindale Secondary School (to 1983), where he was generally referred to as Marty as opposed to Martin. He was elected president of the SAC (student council) in his final year of high school.

The Streek surname is Welsh. Starting in 1977, he became a fan of The Clash who had very little airplay except on a small Brampton radio station, CFNY-FM.

== Career ==
Streek began his career at CFNY during his last year at Erindale Secondary School. Streek hung around CFNY radio station and volunteered with various duties. One of his jobs was to drive around Ontario in a ten-ton truck; setting up and tearing down equipment three days a week. Martin and his colleagues would visit high schools, colleges and universities all over Southern Ontario as part of the CFNY Video Roadshow. The truck was equipped with a video projector, a massive screen, a light show, and industrial strength video players. The biggest Roadshow happened at the Kingswood Music Theatre at Canada's Wonderland in the spring of 1987. More than 15,000 people showed up to watch alternative rock videos.

Streek was hired by the radio station in 1984, and the station grew into one of the biggest stations in Canada. His knowledge and passion of music was vast and he often fought for the new artists he felt the station should play. His voice was also heard nationwide on behalf of a lengthy list of notable advertising clients, including Powerade, Rogers Wireless, Oh Henry, Acura Dealers, Scotiabank, Oil of Olay and the Toronto Sun.

Streek took over Chris Sheppard's slot at The Edge in 1992. Without having any previous on-air experience, Streek began by doing Friday nights from the studio and Saturday nights at Club 102 at the Phoenix, the longest running weekly radio live-to-air broadcast in history. Streek was one of three remaining personalities from the "Spirit of Radio" era of the Edge. Until his departure in May 2009, he hosted the Thursday 30, a four-hour-long show that counted down the top 30 songs of the past week (collected via record sales and listener voting), and introduced new music (a segment called the "Groundbreakers"), with flashbacks to a previous year's countdown, as Streek recalled the top five songs of that week in a certain previous year.

Streek was a big influence in the Ripley's Urban Rail Park/Sound Academy development.

Streek also hosted three live-to-air broadcasts from nightclubs: Friday nights at NRG/The Kingdom in Burlington, which was replaced by Friday Night Live at the Docks/Sound Academy; Saturday nights at the Phoenix; and Sunday nights at Velvet Underground. Streek was a fan of Tool, Nine Inch Nails, David Bowie, Nirvana, and Depeche Mode, in addition to The Clash. The shows were broadcast commercial-free, and Streek would cut in between songs urging listeners to "Come out early and stay late," which became his trademark phrase.

Streek was a huge supporter of local talent, supporting Canadian independent artists such as Saigon Hookers, Alpha Galates and A Primitive Evolution.

Streek was voted DJ of the year a number of times in Now Magazine's year-end public ballot.

In late May 2009, Streek suddenly disappeared off air and from the station's website when his position was cut, along with others such as Barry Taylor, as part of restructuring at the station.

== Death ==
Police received a call at 5:47 p.m, on July 6, 2009, from a fellow tenant at his place of residence. The tenant had bumped into a friend who had received worrying e-mails and text messages from the former host. Authorities say a note was found on the door to Streek's apartment, asking whoever found it to call police. When police arrived, Streek was found dead inside his Broadview Lofts apartment.

Streek took his own life only two months after he finished his 17-year career as a DJ and 25th year as an employee at CFNY-FM (102.1 the Edge). The shock of Streek's death posed a question as to whether or not there was a correlation between the end of Streek's time at the Edge and his death. According to sources he seemed to be completely content with leaving the station and his sudden suicide remains a mystery. Streek had already completed two pilot episodes of a new television show, Martin Streek’s Backstage.

Streek's last status update on Facebook read: "So... I guess that's it... thanks everyone... I'm sorry to those I should be sorry to, I love you to those that I love, and I will see you all again soon (not too soon though)... Let the stories begin."

== Reactions to Streek's death ==
The shock of Streek's death was immediate and in just a few days tens of thousands had joined a Facebook Group entitled "Martin Streek RIP".

Alan Cross, the former program director at 102.1 the Edge, called Streek: "The most charming dude I ever met," and that "The guy lived to make people laugh and to entertain." Former colleague, Todd Shapiro, called Streek an inspiration on this blog, posting: "You were wonderful, caring, passionate, positive, energetic..and man, were you humorous. Personally, you were a mentor, an inspiration, and I always thought of you as a friend. Not only have the stories about you begun but they will never end," he added, perhaps referring to Streek's Facebook message. Long-time friend David Marsden, who ran The Edge back in its CFNY "Spirit of Radio" heyday – posted on his website: "Martin Streek put on his wings earlier today, to the shock of most everyone... Good night, Martin. We don't know what forced you to take this step but we do wish you a wonderful and peaceful rest."

On his site, former Edge music director Kneale Mann wrote on the night of Martin's passing; "What I loved most about Streek was his sense of humor – he was hilarious! He had such quick wit – tears in the eyes, gut splitting, funny guy. Martin was the consummate host. Anytime you were at his place you didn’t go hungry and there was always fresh ice in your glass. He loved to entertain and he did that for a living as well. I last saw Martin a few years ago and we had a day to ourselves. We drove around, talked candidly about life and the radio industry, played some new music in my car, went for a great lunch and that day will always make me smile. Martin was in fine form and we truly enjoyed the time to catch up. I will crank some NiN and Ministry in your honor, sir."

Former Edge host George Stroumboulopoulos is quoted as saying, in February 2009, that "Martin Streek (and Dave Bookman) are so important to this city, what they do for music ... Streek when he's on the radio... quality wins. They believe in music. They are the snipers waiting by the window keeping everyone on their game. Because their music knowledge is impeccable, their passion is unrivaled and they're not afraid to tell you. They understand how important a record can be to your life."

Before an encore at a Broken Social Scene show in Toronto on July 11, Brendan Canning dedicated a song to Streek, announcing that "This one is for a good friend of mine who recently took his life in the name of rock and roll!"

The video for Die Mannequin's Bad Medicine, released in late 2009, has a dedication to Streek at the end of the clip.
