= Edgefest =

Defunct Canadian rock festival

- Logo for the 1999 edition of Edgefest
- Genre: Rock, alternative rock
- Locations: Barrie, Toronto, various Canadian cities
- Years active: 1987–2006, 2008–2015
- Founders: CFNY-FM
- Website: edge.ca/edgefest

Edgefest was an annual outdoor rock festival in Canada. It was founded by staff members of Toronto radio station CFNY-FM. From 1987 to 2015, the festival was held every year in the summer (except for 2007). The festival was most frequently held on Canada Day at Molson Park in Barrie, Ontario or a venue in Toronto. The festival featured predominantly Canadian rock bands. During its 29-year operation, the festival featured more than 300 performers. As of 2015, it was the longest running rock festival in Canada.

== History ==
=== Creation, early years (1987–1989) ===
The festival was created in 1987 by CFNY-FM staffers Scot Turner, Kneale Mann, Alan Cross, Earl Veale, and Phil Evans to celebrate the station's tenth anniversary and the 120th Canada Day.

A lineup, including Blue Rodeo, The Pursuit of Happiness, Teenage Head, and the first foreign act, The Saints, was soon arranged, but finding an appropriate location proved to be difficult. A farmer's field in Oakville, Ontario was considered, but would have involved complications with staging, electricity, bathrooms and parking. Other suggestions included Mosport International Raceway and Cayuga Speedway, but as they were unavailable, Molson Park in Barrie was chosen. Organizers worried that fans would not want to drive from Toronto to the relatively unknown location in Barrie (approximately 90 km [55 mi]), but after purchasing tickets through Pizza Pizza locations for just $1.02 per ticket, over 27,000 people attended the inaugural festival on July 1, 1987.

Although the 1987 festival was supposed to be a one-off event, its success and positive feedback encouraged the organizers to do it again the next year. The 1988 edition was sold out, and brought over 32,000 people to Molson Park. Attendees paid $3 each for admission. The lineup featured mostly Canadian bands, including the first of many appearances by 54-40, and three foreign acts.

In 1989, in spite of competing summer weekend activities and Highway 400 leading up to Molson Park being jammed both from both Cottage country and Toronto, the festival was once again sold out. That year's lineup included Sass Jordan, Sarah McLachlan and The Tragically Hip.

=== Transition period (1990–1992) ===
Between Labour Day 1988 and the end of 1989, CFNY underwent a change in management, which brought with it a change in format. While the festival did go on that year, and once again sold out Molson Park, many people came in order to protest the new programming policies (in fact, someone even hired a plane to tow a protest banner over the park). However, the show went on glitch-free, and featured 54–40, The Tragically Hip, The Pursuit of Happiness, The Grapes of Wrath and The Skydiggers.

By the fifth show, in 1991, the station owners had again been replaced, and the format of both show and station had stabilized. That year's lineup featured the Violent Femmes, who were the first foreign act to perform at the festival in two years. That year's lineup also featured Blue Rodeo and the Crash Test Dummies.

For the 1992 edition, Molson had planned "The Great Canadian Party", a series of Molson-sponsored concerts, simultaneously running across Canada on Canada Day 1992. However, the two companies came to an agreement to share the show, with half the bands booked by the Edge (including 54–40, The Tragically Hip, and Leslie Spit Treeo) and the other half booked by Molson (including Sass Jordan, Amanda Marshall and Spinal Tap).

=== Ontario Place Forum (1993–1994) ===
In 1993, Molson needed the whole park for their own purposes, so the festival relocated to the Ontario Place Forum in Toronto. 1993 was the first year the festival was officially called "Edgefest", a name that stuck with the festival for every year after. It was also the first year to have more than one day of concerts, taking place on July 1 and 2. Day 1 of the festival included The Odds, The Lowest of the Low, The Watchmen and Rheostatics. The first day of the event sold out the Forum. Day 2 featured Radiohead's first performance in Canada.

The 1994 edition of Edgefest also took place at the Ontario Place Forum and featured three international groups; The Proclaimers, Toad the Wet Sprocket, and The Lemonheads. This show was among the last events held at the Forum, which was torn down shortly after and replaced with the Molson Amphitheatre.

=== Molson Amphitheatre, return to Molson Park (1995–1996) ===
Once the new Molson Amphitheatre was built, Molson offered it to Edgefest for three dates in 1995. The first was on the May long weekend, May 21, 1995. About 9,000 people came to see Blur and Elastica, during the height of Britpop. It was also an early major appearance for Our Lady Peace, who recently had success in Canada with their hit singles "Starseed" and "Naveed". Ned's Atomic Dustbin also performed for the last time before breaking up. 15,000 people came for the annual Canada Day edition, which featured an all-Canadian lineup including The Odds, Treble Charger, The Watchmen, hHead, Junkhouse and Crash Vegas. The third Edgefest date of the year occurred on August 5 and had a smaller crowd. Most of the performers were Canadian, but a pre-fame Sugar Ray was also featured. This concert was billed as Sloan's farewell performance. (The band re-formed not long after.)

The festival's tenth incarnation took place back at Molson Park on June 30, 1996. It was the first year in the festival's history that there wasn't a show held on Canada Day. The show was headlined by The Tea Party and sold out with 35,000 people attending the festival.

=== Cross-Canada tour (1997–1999) ===
In 1997, it was announced that Edgefest 1997 would be held across Canada on an eight-city tour. Beginning on June 28, the festival toured through Barrie, Montréal, Quebec; Ottawa, Ontario; Vancouver, British Columbia; Calgary, Alberta; Edmonton, Alberta; Saskatoon, Saskatchewan; and concluded in Winnipeg, Manitoba on September 1, 1997. 25 bands performed during the tour, with Collective Soul, I Mother Earth, Our Lady Peace, The Tea Party, Finger Eleven, Glueleg and The Age of Electric performing at each show (though The Age of Electric missed the Ottawa show due to their gear arriving too late to the venue.) 35,000 people attended the Barrie show. 13,000 attended the Montreal show. 20,000 attended the Ottawa show. 23,000 attended the Calgary show. An estimated 27,000 attended the Edmonton show. 18,000 attended the Winnipeg show.

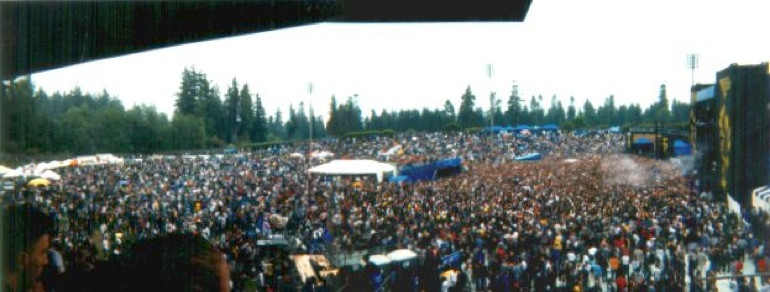
1998 Edgefest in Vancouver, British Columbia.

The 1998 Edgefest tour was similar, with eight shows in eight cities. The lineups varied between the cities, but each show featured American bands Foo Fighters, Green Day, and Creed and Canadian bands Econoline Crush, The Killjoys, Matthew Good Band, Sloan, The Tea Party and The Watchmen. The Barrie show again sold out with 35,000 attendees. The Calgary show had an increase in attendance from the previous year with 27,000 attendees. However, both Ottawa and Edmonton had a decline in attendees from the previous year.

The 1999 tour was headlined by Hole and Moist. Other performers on the tour included Big Wreck, Gob, Len, Rascalz, Serial Joe, Silverchair and Wide Mouth Mason. Because the July 1 show in Barrie sold out in less than a week, a second show was added in Barrie. While the first Barrie show had an attendance of 35,000, the rest of the shows on the tour had varied attendances between 13,000 and 20,000, with 134,058 attending that year's Edgefest tour in total.

=== Final Molson Park shows (2000–2003) ===
In 2000, Edgefest went back to having just one show on Canada Day at Molson Park. The show was headlined by Creed and also featured Filter, Goldfinger, Headstones and Limblifter performing on the main stage. Bands playing the side stage that year included 3 Doors Down and Nickelback. 35,000 people attended the year's show.

In 2001, Edgefest held the traditional Canada Day show at Molson Park, which was headlined by Tool. Due to a late start, the band played a very short set, angering fans. Edgefest 2001 also featured the first appearance of Billy Talent at the festival. August of that year featured an Edgefest tour which was headlined by Blink 182 and also featured New Found Glory and Sum 41. Locations of the tour included Vancouver, Calgary, Edmonton, Toronto, Ottawa, Quebec City and Montreal.

For the next sold out Edgefest in 2002, emergency crews were busy all day treating sunstroke, heat exhaustion, and dehydration. Musically, Nickelback moved up from the side stage to headliners; other bands included Cake (who left the stage 20 minutes into their set after being pelted with bottles), Thirty Seconds to Mars, Default, Simple Plan and Theory of a Deadman. There were also several Edgefest II dates across the country, including shows in Grand Bend and Halifax.

In 2003, there was an outbreak of SARS in Toronto. Bands were nervous to come play there, and insurance companies refused to underwrite tours, fearing lawsuits in case people became infected at a show. Edgefest '03 was delayed until the crisis passed and took place on September 6. The show was billed as "The Last Bash in Barrie" because of plans to relocate the festival to Toronto's Molson Amphitheatre the following year. The lineup for the festival included The Tragically Hip, Our Lady Peace, Sloan, Stereophonics, Thornley and Fefe Dobson.

=== Molson Amphitheatre (2004–2006) ===
Edgefest 2004 at Molson Amphitheatre featured Finger Eleven and Good Charlotte; Billy Talent moved up from their previous Edgefest performance in 2002 to the main stage. Other bands featured included Alexisonfire, Jet, The Salads and Something Corporate.

Edgefest 2005 was headlined by Billy Talent, and also included Coheed and Cambria, Jakalope and Rise Against. That year for the first time there was a side stage designated for a record label, Underground Operations, on which Bombs Over Providence, Closet Monster and Hostage Life, among others, played.

As 2006 was the twentieth year of Edgefest, two shows were scheduled. The first, billed as Edgefest I, took place on July 1. Headliners Our Lady Peace brought fans on stage, encouraged them to use their cameras (use of which was always prohibited) and even allowed them to record an unreleased song, Kiss on the Mouth. Singer Raine Maida asked for a fan's audio recorder and sang into it, as well as into the microphone, during that song. Other bands featured included Keane, Mobile, Neverending White Lights and Hot Hot Heat.

On July 16, Edgefest II took place. It had three stages – the main stage, the Edge Next Big Thing side stage, and the Bedlam Society/Dine Alone Stage, another record label-based stage. Bands performing at Edgefest II included Yellowcard, The All-American Rejects, Story of the Year and The Miniatures.

=== Downsview Park (2008–2013) ===
After there being no Edgefest in 2007, Edgefest returned on July 12, 2008. For the first time since the festival's beginning, the festival was not held at Molson Park nor the Ontario Place Forum/Molson Amphitheatre grounds. Instead, the festival was held at Downsview Park. The 2008 edition featured headlining band Linkin Park and also included Stone Temple Pilots, Sam Roberts and The Bravery. The event sold 15,491 tickets.

Edgefest 2009 was held on June 20 at Downsview Park. The festival organizers were working with a reduced budget, and the ticket prices were lowered. Billy Talent were the headliners. Other main stage acts included AFI, Alexisonfire, k-os, The Stills, Arkells, and Metric.

In 2010, 102.1 The Edge opted to forgo a day-long festival for several concerts throughout the summer months called "The Edge Summer Concert Series".

Edgefest 2011 at Downsview Park featured Rise Against, A Perfect Circle and The Weakerthans.

Edgefest 2012 at Downsview Park featured Billy Talent, Death from above 1979, Silversun Pickups, The Sheepdogs, Young the Giant, and Mushy Callahan.

Edgefest 2013 was headlined by The Lumineers.

=== Echo Beach (2014–2015) ===
In 2014 and 2015, Edgefest was put on as a three-date concert series at Echo Beach in Toronto. There has not been an Edgefest concert in any of the following years, and the festival is presumed to be defunct. Alan Cross has stated that no suitable venue, the weak Canadian dollar, and too much competition from other festivals driving up band prices as reasons why Edgefest has been discontinued.

== See also ==
- List of festivals in Canada
- Music of Canada
- Sunfest (Gimli, Manitoba)
