= Kolter =

Kolter is a given name and surname. Notable people with the name include:

given name

- Kolter Bouchard (born 1991), Canadian radio and online personality

surname

- Joseph P. Kolter (1926–2019), American politician
- Roberto Kolter, American microbiologist
- Zico Kolter, American computer scientist
