= Howard Glassman =

Canadian radio personality

Howard Allen Glassman (born 1960 in Moose Jaw, Saskatchewan), commonly known as Humble Howard, is a Canadian radio personality, best known as co-host with Fred Patterson of the Humble & Fred morning show, which had been heard on Edge 102, Mojo 640 and Mix 99.9 in Toronto.

== Career ==
Howard Glassman has been a national radio host for CHAB (Moose Jaw), CFOX (Vancouver), CKIK (Calgary), CJFM (Montreal), co-host of The Humble and Fred Morning Show at CFNY-FM (Edge 102.1) and Mix 99.9 in Toronto. A veteran stand-up comic, Glassman has hosted Switchback on CBC Television, appeared in national TV commercials for Coors, a movie of the week for CBS (a very small part) and appeared as host and host on other TV shows including The Dini Petty Show on CTV and Ed's Night Party on Citytv.

Glassman's longest continuous on-air job was the Humble & Fred Show which he and Fred Patterson started in 1989 before leaving CFNY for CKFM-FM in May 1991 (which became Mix 99.9 later that year), only to return 19 months later at the end 1992. In April 2001, the team moved to Mojo 640 before leaving for Mix 99.9 in August 2003. Glassman hosted the show until July 2006, when he was let go, as the station changed formats. He was replaced by Mad Dog and Billie.

In August 2008, Glassman returned to the airwaves as co-host of the new morning show on Toronto's CJEZ-FM, which has since been renamed boom 97.3. His co-host on the program was Colleen Rusholme. Glassman and Rusholme were fired from the Boom morning show on May 3, 2011.

On October 15, 2011 Humble & Fred began a weekday podcast show. After airing all or portions of the podcast show on various terrestrial radio stations in southern Ontario between 2012 and 2015, Humble & Fred began airing in the 7 a.m. to 9 a.m. slot on SiriusXM's newly re-branded Canada Laughs channel beginning May 9, 2013 in addition to still offering a podcast version of the show online.

Glassman can be seen in the 2003 documentary film Flyerman. The movie shows him interviewing a guest live on air.

As further testament to his talents, Glassman continues to perform stand up comedy at local events, corporate functions and for charity.

== Personal ==
Glassman married Randee Rosenthal in fall 1989, sixteen months after meeting her in May 1988 in Montreal while they both worked at CJFM-FM. The couple had two daughters before divorcing in mid-to-late 2000s.
