= Scruff Connors =

Canadian radio personality (1952–2016)

- Born: Jeffrey David Newfield; 12 May 1952; Toronto, Ontario, Canada
- Died: 18 December 2016 (aged 64)
- Presenting career
- Stations: CILQ-FM Toronto; WYSP, Philadelphia; CHTZ-FM, St. Catharines; CFBR-FM Edmonton; CJKR-FM Winnipeg; CFMJ (MOJO) Toronto
- Style: Rock radio, shock jock
- Country: Canada

Jeffrey David Newfield (12 May 1952 – 18 December 2016), known as Scruff Connors, was a Canadian radio broadcaster known for conducting controversial on-air practical jokes.

His career included host duties at various radio stations in Canada and the United States. His most prominent work was with Q107 in Toronto, where he became morning host in 1980. After broadcasting in other cities, he returned to Q107 in the early 1990s to join "The Q Morning Zoo". In 1980, after Terry Fox was forced to abandon his Marathon of Hope, Connors responded by raising CAD$72,000 for cancer research by continuously hosting a 36-hour "Scruff-a-thon" on Q107.

== Radio stunts ==
At one point while working at Q107 in 1982, Connors confined himself to the station's on-air studio and repeatedly aired the Led Zeppelin song "Stairway to Heaven".

By July 1982, Connors completed 107 trips in seven hours on the Mighty Canadian Minebuster roller coaster at Canada's Wonderland establishing a record during the theme park's initial years.

Connors conducted a contest in 1989 as an announcer at CHTZ-FM in St. Catharines, Ontario, claiming that the Mayflower would be stationed at a nearby port so that 40 winners would be eligible to have a Thanksgiving meal there. However, what actually appeared was a moving truck from Mayflower Transit.

While still at CHTZ-FM, the disc jockey announced during a 21 March 1990 broadcast that "new kids" would appear at the station the following day. The music group New Kids on the Block were scheduled to play in nearby Hamilton later that week. Although that band's music was not aired on the rock-oriented CHTZ-FM, hundreds of fans of the boy band appeared at the station, expecting to see their idols. Instead, they were greeted with limousines arriving at the station containing several mothers and their newborn infants (or "new kids"). Some of the upset crowd tried to enter the station building, requiring the station to secure the facilities.

In January 1995, while working in Winnipeg, Connors was given a week's suspension by CJKR-FM management after he announced a contest where selected listeners could watch Super Bowl XXIX in Miami. 1200 listeners submitted their entries by fax of whom 30 were chosen to meet Connors at Winnipeg International Airport. However, the winners boarded a bus at the airport rather than a plane, and their destination was Miami, Manitoba to watch the game on a monochrome television at Chatterbox Lounge. Connors reacted to the controversy stating "How was I supposed to know Miami was in Florida?"

== Controversy ==
In mid-1982, CHUM-FM avoided direct mention of Toronto club venue Scuffers during its entertainment announcements due to its naming resemblance to Scruff Connors at rival station Q107. Scuffers' owners suspended advertising at CHUM-FM because the radio station referred to their club by its address or as "The Cave".

When Connors was working for The Bear (CFBR-FM) in Edmonton in 1992, he was charged with sexual assault in a case that purportedly occurred at a hotel in October 1992. He was acquitted of these charges in January 1993, although Connors reconsidered his broadcasting career due to the stress of this case. The broadcaster sustained a reported nervous breakdown in October 1995, which he blamed on job stress and uncertainty.

During a broadcast at Toronto's MOJO Radio on 16 November 2001, Connors and co-host John Derringer joked about obtaining a job at a multicultural radio station. The duo called Fairchild Radio only to receive a voice mail message, at which point Connors proceeded to speak around the recording with a phony Chinese accent. The executive director of the Chinese Canadian National Council complained to the Canadian Broadcast Standards Council (CBSC) charging that the broadcast was racist. The CBSC ruled that this incident did not breach the Canadian Association of Broadcasters Code of Ethics regarding "abusive or discriminatory" material, although the dialogue could be considered in questionable taste.

== Declining health ==
Connors incurred injuries to his two rotator cuffs, limiting his arm movements.

His last on-air job, at MOJO radio, was terminated in July 2005 when the station changed its format. Within a few months, Connors experienced a pair of heart attacks which required quadruple heart bypass surgery. Later in 2005, doctors discovered that Connors had contracted bladder cancer.

In late January 2008, during an interview with fellow radio broadcaster Fred Patterson, Connors indicated that he was in good health following various operations. He stated that he was recuperating in Osoyoos, British Columbia. In August 2008, a poster to a Canadian radio discussion board posted a rumour that Connors had died the previous evening, but Connors later clarified in an interview with the Toronto Sun that he was still alive and had recently won over $100,000 in a Lotto 6/49 draw.

On 18 December 2016, Newfield unexpectedly died.

== Career ==
Connors' work included the following radio stations:

- 1980 – 1985: Q107, Toronto
- late 1980s: WYSP, Philadelphia
- 1989–1992: CHTZ-FM, St. Catharines, Ontario
- August – October 1992: CFBR-FM, Edmonton
- January 1993 – July 1994: Q107, Toronto
- July 1994 – 1995: CJKR-FM Winnipeg
- 2001 – July 2005: CFMJ (MOJO), Toronto
