= Fred Patterson =

Canadian radio personality

Fred Richard Patterson, commonly known as Freddie P, is a Canadian radio personality, best known as co-host with Howard Glassman of the Humble & Fred morning show, which had been heard on Edge 102, Mojo 640 and Mix 99.9 in Toronto.

== Career ==
Fred Patterson has been a national radio host for CKFH (Toronto), CHIC (Brampton) and co-host of The Humble and Fred Morning Show at Edge 102, Mojo 640 and Mix 99.9 in Toronto. A former sports director at Edge 102, he was heard as an occasional co-host of The Bill Watters show on AM640 and is a frequent guest on CH TV's Live at 5:30. He served as Program Director of Corus' Peterborough radio stations from 2008 to 2011.

Patterson's longest continuous on-air job was the Humble & Fred Morning Show which he and Howard Glassman started in 1989 before Glassman left CFNY for CKFM-FM in May 1991 (which became Mix 99.9 later that year), only to return 19 months later at the end 1992. In April 2001, the team moved to Mojo 640 before leaving for Mix 99.9 in August 2003. Patterson was relieved of his duties at Mix 99.9 in August 2005, though he remained under contract. Glassman hosted the show alone for only about a year before he too was let go.

On October 15, 2011 Humble and Fred began a weekday podcast. After airing all or portions of the podcast show on various terrestrial radio stations in southern Ontario between 2012 and 2015, Humble & Fred began airing in the 7 a.m. to 9 a.m. slot on SiriusXM's newly re-branded Canada Laughs channel beginning May 9, 2013 in addition to still offering a podcast version of the show online.
