= Fearless Fred Kennedy =

Canadian radio host, comic writer, and voice actor

- Born: 1981 (age 44–45)
- Years active: late 1990s-present

Fearless Fred Kennedy (born 1981) is a Canadian radio personality, television host, voice actor, and comic book writer.

He is primarily recognized for his work at prominent Toronto radio stations Q107 and 102.1 The Edge. He was also the long-time national host of the adult animation block Teletoon at Night.

== Early life ==
Kennedy was born in Halifax, Nova Scotia, into a military family. He often refers to himself as a "base brat" due to moving frequently during his childhood.

While his father was stationed in Belgium, Kennedy spent time exploring ancient Roman ruins. This childhood experience sparked a lifelong obsession with history, which eventually became a major theme in his professional writing.

== Career ==
=== Radio and Television ===
Kennedy began his broadcasting career in the late 1990s in Cape Breton. He worked at several stations across Canada, including stops in Dryden, Winnipeg, and his hometown of Edmonton.

In 2009, he moved to Toronto to join the alternative rock station 102.1 The Edge, a high-profile transition that garnered media coverage as he took over the afternoon drive slot following the departure of veteran broadcaster Martin Streek. In 2018, he transitioned to the classic rock station Q107, where he currently hosts the afternoon drive show.

From 2010 to 2016, Kennedy was the face of Teletoon at Night. Under the name "Fred at Night," he hosted a dedicated programming block between animated series such as Archer and Family Guy, providing commentary on pop culture, video games, and comic books.

=== Writing and Comics ===
Kennedy is an active comic book author, often focusing on gritty historical fiction or science fiction.

- Dead Romans (2023): Published by Image Comics, this series is a fictionalized account of the Battle of the Teutoburg Forest. The miniseries received positive critical reception from independent comic reviewers for its script and artwork.
- The Florida Hippopotamus Cocaine Massacre (2026): An action-comedy series published by Mad Cave Studios. The first issue was a significant indie success, featuring federal agents and drug-fueled hippos.
- Speed Racer: Tales from the Road: A modern revival of the classic Speed Racer franchise.
- Mud 79: An independent, scripted audio drama set in the Star Wars universe, following Imperial Army recruits.

== Filmography ==
Year	Title	Role	Notes
2015–present	Super Science Friends	Albert Einstein	Web series; Voice role
2023–present	Total Drama Island	Ripper	Voice role; Reboot series

== Awards ==
- Steve Young Broadcaster of the Year Award (2009) — The first-ever recipient of this national award for emerging Canadian radio talent.
