= The Ongoing History of New Music =

Canadian radio program

- Genre: Alt-Rock Music History
- Running time: Sundays: 60 Minutes
- Country of origin: Canada
- Language: English
- Home station: CFNY
- Syndicates: CILQ, CILV, CFPL, CJDV, CFMK, CKHY, CKWF, CJKR, CHDI, CFGP, CFGQ, CJZN, CFOX, WAPS
- Hosted by: Alan Cross
- Produced by: Rob Johnston
- Recording studio: Toronto, Ontario, Canada
- Original release: 1993–present
- No. of series: 28
- No. of episodes: 969 (as of end of 2022)

The Ongoing History of New Music is the longest running music history documentary radio program in Canada. produced by Corus Entertainment and hosted by Alan Cross. It is syndicated to several radio stations, mostly but not exclusively Corus-owned, across Canada.

The Ongoing History chronicles the history of alternative rock, from its roots in punk and new wave to the modern day. An episode of the show may profile an important musician or band, a significant musical trend such as grunge or Madchester, or a theme such as payola, gay musicians or significant cult figures. Some topics are covered in a single show, while more substantial topics may be presented over multiple episodes.

== History ==
In early 1993, Alan Cross was tasked by management at CFNY-FM to create a weekly documentary that would place this new alt-rock into context for their listeners. The show aired its first episode on February 28, 1993. It aired 691 episodes before Cross was dismissed from the company in 2011.

The show went into hiatus with no new shows being produced until Cross was re-hired by CFNY in 2014.

In February 2023, the show celebrated 30 years since it first aired in Toronto.

== Reoccurring yearly episodes ==
- Starting in 2015, a yearly episode called 60 Mind-Blowing Facts in 60 Minutes become a regular feature in which Cross covers all the tiny, but interesting facts he has come across in the last 12 months but there isn't enough to build a whole show around.
- Every year on the last Sunday before Christmas the annual Xmas Show airs. This is a showcase of Alt-Rock Christmas music, with much of it having been released in the last calendar year. This episode always ends with Twas The Night Before Christmas recited by Henry Rollins.

== Other media ==
The show's format and name can be found on a series of 4 compilation CDs, and 4 audiobooks.
