= Amanda Barker =

Canadian actress

- Born: September 1st Hanover, Massachusetts
- Occupations: Actress, writer, director, producer

Amanda J. Barker is an American, Canadian, and Italian comedic and dramatic actress, writer, director, and producer. She is best known for her roles in The Handmaid's Tale, Ginny and Georgia, Mayor of Kingstown, American Gods, and Murdoch Mysteries.

== Early life ==
Amanda Barker was born in Hanover, Massachusetts to Daniel Barker (a drummer and cymbal maker) and Valerie Gibson Barker (a dance and performing arts teacher). When she was a teen, her father became CEO of Sabian Cymbals moving the family to Woodstock, New Brunswick. After high school, she attended Mount Allison University graduating with a double major in English Literature, Drama, and a minor in Canadian Studies. After graduation, Barker worked and lived in Monaco and later as an English teacher in Seoul. After a stint working for Royal Caribbean International, she moved to Toronto to pursue acting in 2000. She began working as major league baseball's only female mascot, Diamond, with the Toronto Blue Jays until she left to work at the Second City. Barker met future husband Marco Timpano there, performing in Tony n’ Tina’s Wedding and would eventually perform with Second City's Touring Company and then eventually for Norwegian Cruise Lines. The couple married in 2010. In 2012, she was a writer and star in the hit show Release the Stars: The Ballad of Randy and Evi Quaid at the Toronto fringe festival which brought the controversial title pair out of a year of hiding with their surprise attendance. From 2012 to 2015, Barker toured North America with the hit show Spank! The Fifty Shades Parody.

== 2015 - present ==
In 2015, Barker began working full time on air for SiriusXM for Humble & Fred after a year of filling in for former co-host Eileen Ross and would continue in that role until 2020. These years also saw a string of character roles in film and TV with occasional roles in theatres across Canada. In 2018 her musical Little Black Dress, co-authored with Christopher Bond, Natalie Tenenbaum, and Danielle Trczinski, began touring North America. In 2019 her play Clotheswap opened at the Textile Museum of Canada which garnered buzz in Toronto for its interactive component as both a show and a Clothing swap. In 2019, Barker won the Canadian Comedy Award for best comedic performance for the webseries A Gay Victorian Affair. Barker and husband Marco Timpano host and produce The Insomnia Project podcast for Acast with over 2 million downloads.

In the spring of 2023, it was announced that she would be in Thanksgiving, a film directed by Eli Roth. In the summer of 2023, she was shooting a new feature with Lilly Singh.

Barker is a citizen of United States, Canada, and Italy.

== Filmography ==
=== Television ===
Year	Title	Role
2007	Get Set for Life	Cinderella
2014	Video on Trial	Much Music
2015	Harper Puppet Pals	Various Voices
2016	You Got Trumped	Rosie O'Donnell
2016	Women are From Mars	Becca
2016-2018	Odd Squad	Frieda Fiver
2017	Saving Hope	Eunice
2017	Star Falls	Amanda
2018	Frankie Drake Mysteries	Eileen "Redwood" Richardson
2018	The Handmaid's Tale	Tricia
2018	Designated Survivor	Karen Slater
2018	Dino Dana	Ashley
2018	A Gay Victorian Affair	Lady Vanessa
2020	Bajillionaires	Tina
2021	Overlord and the Underwoods	Ms. Pressburger
2021	Most Dangerous Game	Linda
2021	Mayor of Kingstown	Wilma Van Ackle
2021	Ginny & Georgia	Jackie's Mom
2021	American Gods	Sheila
2022	Murdoch Mysteries	Judge Perrywinkle

=== Film ===
Year	Title	Role
2013	The Case for Christmas	Secretary
2013	Blood Empires	Dom
2015	Zoom	Married Woman
2015	88	Waitress
2015	St Mary	Mafalda
2018	Paper Year	Esme
2020	Marry Me This Christmas	Mrs. Ramirez
2023	Thanksgiving	Lizzie
2023	Doin' It	Mrs. Wyatt
2023	Flint Strong	Clark
2023	Relax, I'm from the Future	Librarian
2023	Strangers in a Room	Janet
2023	Six Days to Die	The Tooth
