= Sarah Hainsworth =

Sarah Hainsworth OBE FREng
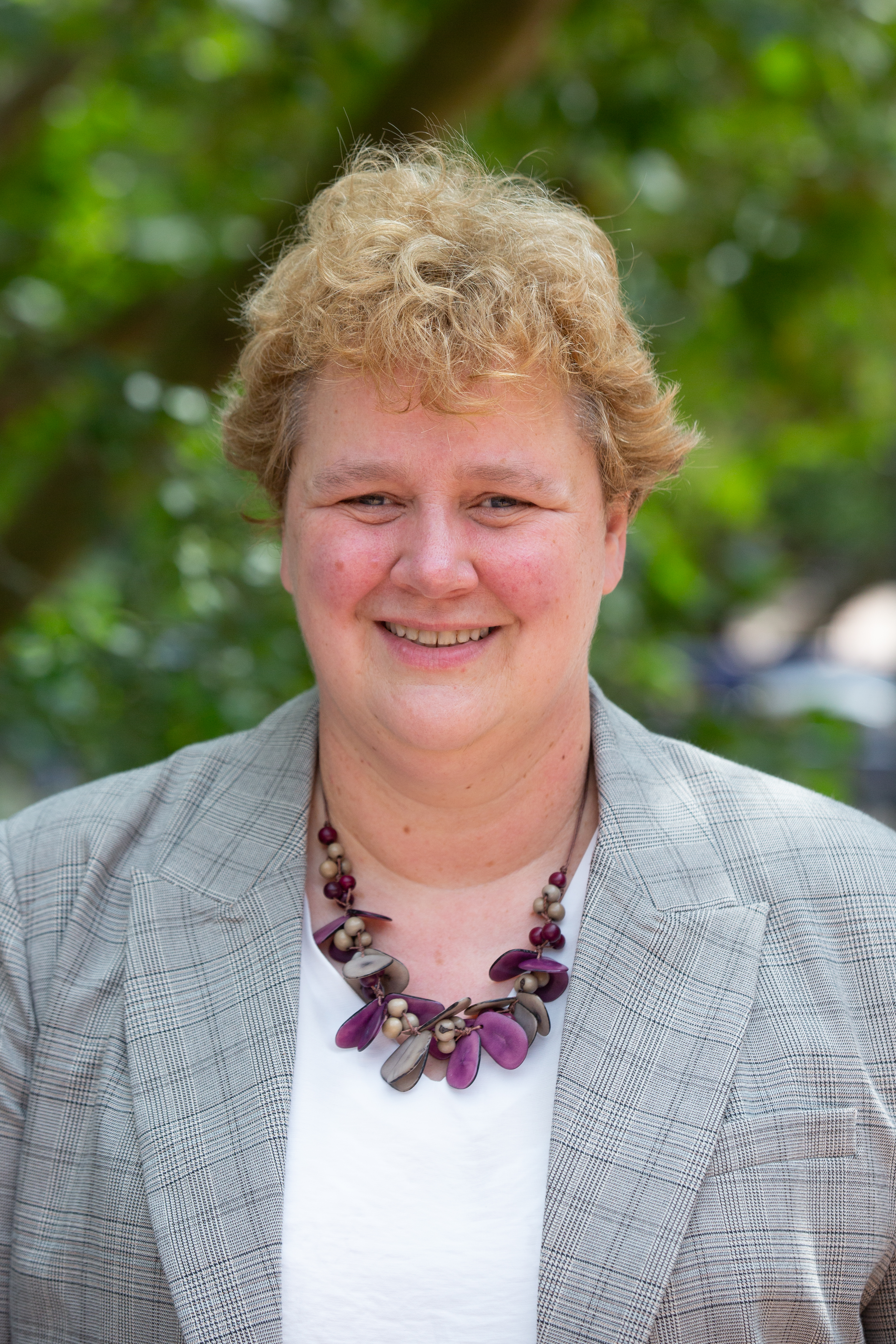
- Prof Sarah Hainsworth in 2021
- Born: 5 October 1967 (age 59); Leeds
- Education: Richmond School, University of Newcastle
- Occupations: Pro-Vice-Chancellor (Research), Durham University
- Scientific career
- Fields: Materials Engineering; Forensic Engineering Science
- Workplaces: Durham University; University of Bath; Aston University; University of Leicester; University of Newcastle upon Tyne
- Thesis: Factors Influencing the Tribology of Ceramic Surfaces (1993)
- Doctoral advisor: Prof Trevor Page

Sarah Victoria Hainsworth (born 5 October 1967 in Leeds) is Pro-Vice-Chancellor (Research) at Durham University. Previously she was Pro-Vice-Chancellor (Research) at the University of Bath, Pro-Vice-Chancellor and Executive Dean of the School of Engineering and Applied Science at Aston University, Professor of Materials and Forensic Engineering, and Head of the Department of Engineering, at the University of Leicester.

== Education ==
Hainsworth studied at Richmond School. She was later educated at the University of Newcastle where she was awarded BEng and PhD degrees.

== Career ==
Hainsworth came to public attention for her analysis of the wounds found on the skeleton of Richard III. This related the tool marks to possible weapons. Her work has also included engineering a safe drinking glass by examining how the design and manufacture of glasses influences the way in which they fracture. She has also done research on automotive materials, is Director of the Advanced Microscopy Centre and heads the Materials Technology Integration Centre (MaTIC). In 2016 she succeeded Professor Helen Atkinson as Head of the Department of Engineering at the University of Leicester. She has acted as an expert witness and actively encourages young women to take up engineering as a career. From 2017, Hainsworth worked at Aston University as their Pro-Vice-Chancellor and Executive Dean of the School of Engineering and Applied Science. Hainsworth joined the University of Bath as Pro-Vice-Chancellor (Research) in December 2021. Hainsworth then took up a position at Durham University as Pro-Vice-Chancellor (Research) in February 2026.

== Awards and honours ==
Hainsworth was awarded the Institution of Mechanical Engineers Tribology Bronze Medal in 1995, the Rosenhain Medal of the Institute of Materials, Minerals, and Mining in 2008, and was nominated as one of the Women's Engineering Society's Outstanding Technical Women in 2009. In 2015, she received the American Academy of Forensic Sciences Engineering Sciences Section Andrew H. Payne Jr. Special Achievement Award in recognition of her contributions to forensic engineering sciences. In 2016 she was elected to the Royal Academy of Engineering. She became a Trustee of the Academy in September 2023. Hainsworth was awarded an OBE in the 2019 New Year Honours for services to engineering and to forensic science.
