= Kolter Bouchard =

Canadian radio DJ and internet personality

Kolter Bouchard (born 1991) is a Canadian radio, online personality, and digital content producer based in Toronto. He co-hosted the afternoon drive program on CFNY-FM (102.1 The Edge) from late 2018 until March 2024, first with Meredith Geddes and from May 2023 with Casey-Jo Loos. Bouchard was diagnosed with Stage 2 Hodgkin’s lymphoma in 2020 when he was in his late twenties and is in remission.

Bouchard left Corus Entertainment and CFNY in March 2024 to become a full-time content developer. Bouchard has a TikTok following of 589,000 and another 272,000 on Instagram. He and his wife, Dominique Bouchard, co-founded digital production agency Symal Creative and co-host a relationships podcast, Playing House.

He is a graduate of the RTA School of Media at Ryerson University (now Toronto Metropolitan University). While at Ryerson, he was a host on campus radio station CKLN-FM and also a member of its board of directors.

After graduating, Bouchard worked as the morning host on CJDC-AM in Dawson Creek, British Columbia from 2013 to 2015 when he went to Dubai to work co-hosting the afternoon drive show on English-language radio station Channel 4 FM for two years. Returning to Ontario, he worked as a fill-in announcer at Rock 95 in Barrie, Ontario and then at Q107 in Toronto until moving to sister station CFNY in 2018.

In 2025, Bouchard signed a publishing deal with Simon & Schuster's subsidiary, Post Hill Press. His debut book, Playing House: Ten Steps to a Sexy, Secure Relationship, releases on December 8, 2026.
