= Herb Hainsworth =

Australian rules footballer

Personal information
- Full name: William Herbert Hainsworth
- Born: 27 May 1881; Geelong, Victoria
- Died: 13 February 1955 (aged 73); Geelong, Victoria
- Original team: Wellington

Playing career^{1}
Years	Club	Games (Goals)
1902	Carlton	1 (2)
- ^{1} Playing statistics correct to the end of 1902.

William Herbert Hainsworth (27 May 1881 – 13 February 1955) was an Australian rules footballer who played with Carlton in the Victorian Football League (VFL).
