= Dean Blundell =

Canadian radio host

- Occupations: radio personality, podcaster
- Years active: 1990s–present
- Known for: The Dean Blundell Show (CFNY-FM, 2001–2014), Dean Blundell & Co. (CJCL, 2015–2017)
- Website: deanblundell.com

Dean Blundell is a former Canadian radio personality and current X commentator. Best known as a longtime "shock jock" morning host on CFNY-FM (The Edge) in Toronto, Ontario, in 2015 he was named the new morning host on sports radio station CJCL (Sportsnet 590 The Fan). His show on Sportsnet was cancelled in February 2017.

Blundell worked for CJOK-FM in Fort McMurray and CIMX-FM in Windsor, Ontario before joining CFNY in 2001. His self-titled show on CFNY debuted soon after Corus Entertainment reassigned his longtime predecessors Humble and Fred to talk radio sister station CFMJ.

== The Dean Blundell Show ==
During Blundell's stint on CFNY, his program frequently faced complaints to the Canadian Broadcast Standards Council regarding offensive content.

These included complaints about sexually explicit discussion, vulgar terminology used in a comment on the sexuality of Justin Bieber, derogatory comments about women, and comments that appeared to support violence against women.

The program received a one-day suspension following a 2004 appearance by Jackass cast member Steve-O, in which Steve-O urinated on the studio floor, used several profanities, and performed a stunt that involved wrapping duct tape around his penis.

In 2009, he was sued for defamation by Linda Jackson, the mayor of Vaughan, after reportedly calling her a "fraudster" and a "fat pig" on the air.

In 2011, he granted an interview to Shirley Phelps-Roper in exchange for the Westboro Baptist Church dropping its controversial plan to picket the funeral of 2011 Tucson shooting victim Christina Taylor Green.

In 2013, he was widely criticized for comments that appeared to mock the death of hockey player Kristiāns Pelšs, suggesting that Pelšs (whose death was accidental) had committed suicide because that was preferable to living in Edmonton.

Through 2012 and 2013, Blundell's show was the subject of nine separate complaints to the Canadian Broadcast Standards Council, and was formally censured six times.

Blundell was indefinitely suspended from CFNY in December 2013, following reports that he and cohost Derek Welsman had discussed on the air a jury trial in which Welsman was the foreman. The trial concerned a sexual assault charge against a client of a gay bathhouse, and Blundell and Welsman's commentary about it was criticized both for homophobia and for potentially causing a mistrial by publicly discussing the jury deliberations. The program's cancellation was announced in January 2014.

== Subsequent career ==
Following his departure from CFNY, Blundell launched a podcast, and announced plans to launch his own Internet radio stream. He guest hosted an episode of Fan 590's Jeff Blair Show in May 2014 and was named to the station's permanent new lineup in 2015.

Rogers Radio executive Scott Moore expressed confidence that Blundell's controversial history would not detract from the station's brand, noting that "He knows that this is a very different show. His mandate at the Edge was to be edgy and he knows a) that's not what we’re asking for and b) it would be unacceptable." He was dropped from Fan 590 in February 2017.

Blundell said in 2018 that he regretted the on-air controversies from his show on CFNY-FM.

=== Digital media, Substack, and political commentary ===
Following his exit from traditional broadcast radio, Blundell transitioned into independent digital media, establishing the blog DeanBlundell.com and later migrating his primary content operations to the online subscription platform Substack. Operating as an independent commentator, his multimedia platform secured a subscriber base of over 84,000, placing his newsletter on Substack's culture bestseller leaderboards.

During this period, Blundell's editorial focus shifted from broadcast entertainment to Canadian and American political commentary. His writing frequently focused on the defense of democratic institutions, anti-corruption commentary, and the critique of populist political movements. Through his platform, Blundell partnered with American political strategist Steve Schmidt to co-host the podcast series "Dead Air" as part of Schmidt's The Warning network, aligning his coverage with the Save America Movement to analyze international security, democratic backsliding, and institutional accountability across Canada and the United States.
