= Michael Hainsworth =

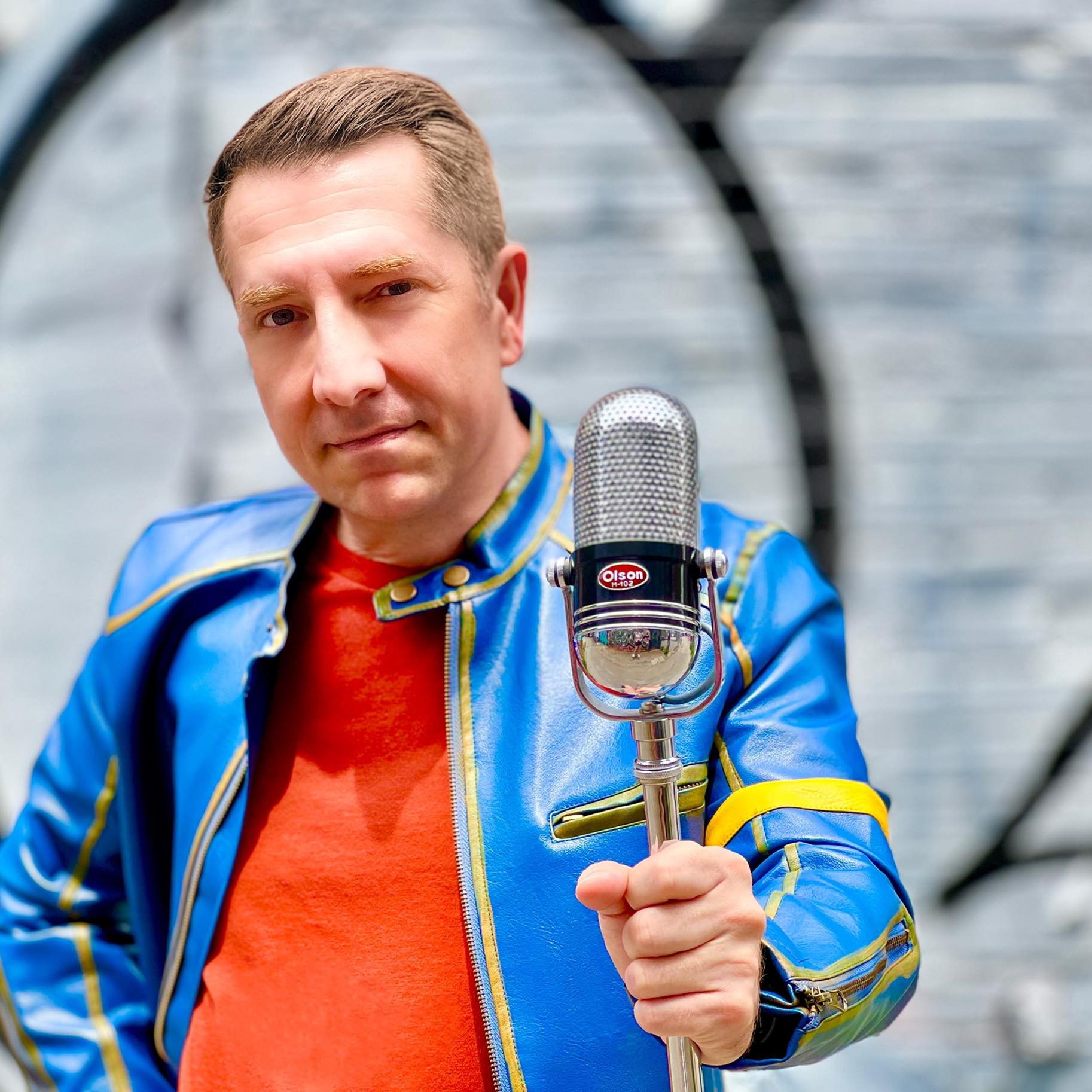
Michael Hainsworth Michael Hainsworth, August 2022
- Born: Ontario, Canada
- Education: Humber College: Radio Broadcasting (1990 – 1992)
- Occupation: Independent Technology & Finance Content Creator
- Employer: Self employed
- Known for: Former reporter for CTV Toronto, Anchor of The Business News and The Close on Canada's financial news network, Business News Network.
- Website: http://www.hainsworth.com

Michael Hainsworth is a former business reporter for CTV Toronto and CTV affiliates across Canada. He anchored The Close on Canada's financial news network, BNN Bloomberg (formerly Business News Network). He also filed business reports for Toronto all-news channel CablePulse24 and national cable news network CTV News Channel. He is no longer with CTV or BNN, having left mainstream media in 2018 to launch an independent content creation studio. For 8 seasons, Hainsworth also co-hosted the podcast Geeks and Beats with Alan Cross. In September, 2022, Hainsworth relaunched the show as a web series Where's My Jetpack? about the technology we were promised as kids, what we actually got, and what's coming next in which he adopts a "rant" style delivery about news of the day tied to science-related topics. He now produces regular rants related to finance and public policy. Hainsworth's reporting on the bankruptcy of HBC titled "The American who Killed HBC" garnered almost 1M views and more than 36,000 likes. Hainsworth's rant Time to Bring Back the Experts was one of his earliest social successes and has more than 17K views on Twitter.

== Career ==
A veteran Toronto broadcaster, Michael got his start in radio at Mix 99.9 in Toronto 1988 producing overnight music and current affairs shows while still in high school. Hainsworth's 11 years in radio include six at the all-news station 680 News in Toronto. During his tenure as a reporter for the station, Hainsworth won the 1998 Best Spot News award from the Toronto Police Service for his breaking news coverage of the crash of the RAF Hawker Siddeley Nimrod aircraft during the Canadian International Air Show. He later filled in as anchor the "afternoon drive" broadcast before moving to the business desk.

In 2000, Hainsworth moved to television, taking a position in the nascent BNN.

In addition to once hosting some of BNN's top rated programs, viewers may also have recognized Michael Hainsworth for his work distilling the day's financial news on local CTV newscasts across Canada and for CTV News Channel.

Hainsworth frequently refers to himself as a "computer geek" and maintains a technology and human interest oriented blog that features stories often covered for the networks. Hainsworth also used to operate a Mac-oriented First Class Bulletin Board System (BBS) called "Sanctuary". He regularly interviewed technology analyst, David Garrity, on the latest technology trends.

== Education ==
Hainsworth is an honours graduate of the radio program at Humber College in Toronto.

== Awards ==
- Toronto Police Best Spot News Award, the crash of the RAF Nimrod, 1995
- Days of Action Protest, RTNDA, 1995
