= CFNY-FM =

Radio station in Ontario, Canada

Coordinates: 43.64362°N 79.36677°W

- Brampton, Ontario; Canada
- Broadcast area: Greater Toronto Area
- Frequency: 102.1 MHz
- Branding: 102.1 The Edge

Programming
- Format: Classic alternative

Ownership
- Owner: Corus Radio (Corus Entertainment); (Corus Premium Television Ltd.)
- Sister stations: CFGQ-FM, CJKR-FM, CILQ-FM, CFIQ, CIII-DT

History
- First air date: August 8, 1960
- Former call signs: CHIC-FM (1960–1976)

Technical information
- Licensing authority: CRTC
- Class: C1
- ERP: 32,290 watts
- HAAT: 449 metres (1,473 ft)

Links
- Webcast: Listen live
- Website: edge.ca

CFNY-FM (102.1 MHz, "102.1 The Edge") is a radio station licensed to Brampton, Ontario. Owned by Corus Entertainment, the station broadcasts a classic alternative format serving the Greater Toronto Area. Its studios are in downtown Toronto at Corus Quay on Toronto's Harbourfront, and its transmitter is located atop the CN Tower.

== History ==
=== From CHIC to CFNY ===
The station commenced operations on August 8, 1960, as an FM rebroadcast of an AM station, CHIC. On September 21, 1962, two brothers, Leslie and Harry Allen Jr., agreed to purchase all shares of CHIC Radio Ltd. from S.W. Caldwell, Frank M. Early, F.J. Shouldice, John Fox, W.S. Martin, Frank W. Richardson, Garth H. Ketemer, G. Clare Burt, J.R. Jenkins and Gordon F. Keeble. The sale occurred on October 15 later that year and was subject to government approval. They began playing album rock music in the evenings while simulcasting the AM programming during the day. The nearby Humber College provided a steady stream of young employees, who were encouraged to play their own selections. Noted Canadian radio and television personality Vicki Gabereau was one of such employees. At this point in the station's existence, it operated under the call letters CHIC-FM, broadcasting about 30 hours per week, with a transmitter power of 857 watts ERP mono. This was enough to just service the town of Brampton.

Until approximately 1975, the AM control room operator spun LPs from the third turntable in AM master control. Nonstop full play of each side of the LP was the norm - with just a break by the AM operator for ID and to flip the LP over. The music was picked by the AM operator prior to their shift. Some of those on air people were Dave Gordon, Mike Lynch, Steve Martak, Rich Elwood, Ted Woloshyn, Scott Cameron; any genre of music was open to airtime.

The style of the station was well received by listeners. In 1976, a new FM studio was built just up the road from the old studio in Brampton on a very limited budget. Engineers Mike Hargrave Pawson and Steve Martak built the new studio and a new transmitter site in Georgetown to increase the coverage from 857 watts to 100 kW ERP, thus able to cover much of the Greater Toronto Area.

CHIC & CFNY billed side by side

In 1976, CHIC-FM officially became CFNY-FM. The phrases "Canada's First New Youth", "Canada Finds New Youth", and "Canada's Fresh New Youth" have often been cited as backronyms for the call sign. Staff employed to that point were fired in favour of hiring a new team and David Pritchard joined the station as CFNY's first program director. He had previously been a DJ at CHUM-FM, and under his guidance the station became more structured. It also began hosting specialty programs of reggae and blues music, and a popular, nationally syndicated Beatles show.

David Marsden, who had started as an announcer at the station, was selected as Pritchard's successor in 1978.

=== "The Spirit of Radio" ===
During Marsden's tenure as program director, the style of the station evolved into a sound which has been described as a more professional-sounding version of a campus radio station. At the time, alternative music was new and had not yet received wide exposure, but new wave and punk rock soon emerged as dominant forms of popular music—and so the station became known as one of the few commercial stations at the time which played alternative music.

"The Spirit of Radio" logo used by CFNY during the early and mid-1980s

During this period, the station began using "The Spirit of Radio" as a promotional catchphrase. In turn, listeners of the station began to refer to CFNY as "The Spirit of Radio". Canadian band Rush was unable to obtain airplay on many radio stations other than CFNY early in their career; in 1979, the band wrote the song "The Spirit of Radio" about the station. Unable to mention CFNY directly for fear of alienating airplay on other stations, the band instead ensured the catalogue number for their album Permanent Waves was 1021, a nod to the station's 102.1 FM frequency.

While the fan base was loyal, the station struggled to grow its audience due to its small studio and low broadcasting power of only 679 watts. With only a small broadcast range, the station used unconventional promotional strategies in an attempt to grow the brand. CFNY would send DJs to host regular new wave dance parties, both to build a community amongst its fans and to supplement the station's limited advertising revenue through admission fees.

=== Turbulence and expansion ===
In 1979, the station's original owners were involved in court action unrelated to CFNY and forced to sell the station. In spite of its problems, CFNY garnered praise from its listeners and other broadcasters alike. Referring to its free-form format, the station was called "one of the last truly alternative radio stations in North America". When the new owners went bankrupt in 1979, the station received 6,200 letters and tens of thousands of names on a petition lobbying the Canadian Radio-television and Telecommunications Commission to "save real radio."

With the Canadian economy in recession and interest rates high, the station's owners sold the station to media conglomerate Selkirk Communications. Selkirk moved the station's transmitter to the CN Tower in Toronto, thereby greatly increasing the broadcasting power and range of the station. By 1985, the station had reached new heights of popularity, capturing over 5.4% of the Toronto area listeners and becoming internationally famous for its music mix, due to its availability via satellite. By this time, the station's dance party tradition had evolved into a large video dance party, hosted by Martin Streek, who joined the station as a DJ and on-air personality in 1984. This event regularly toured throughout southern Ontario and expanded the station's influence well beyond its actual broadcast range. For a brief period, it was also available on satellite across North America, although this also led to the introduction of more "popular" music.

Through the early and mid-1980s, CFNY was well-respected for introducing new performers that other stations wouldn't play due to not being well-known names, including Canadian artists such as Martha and the Muffins, Rough Trade, Blue Rodeo, Jane Siberry, 54-40, Skinny Puppy, Spoons and Sherry Kean.

CFNY also created Canada's first independent music awards, the U-Knows, the name of which was a pun on Canada's mainstream Juno Awards. In 1985, the station held a listener contest to rename the awards, which were re-dubbed the CASBY Awards, for "Canadian Artists Selected By You".

In 1987, after nine years in the position, David Marsden stepped down as program director. He was succeeded in the role by on-air personality Don Berns. Marsden moved to Vancouver, where he created and launched the variety series Pilot One for CBC Television and became program director of Coast 800.

One notable broadcast was their worldwide period of silence for John Lennon, followed by "Remember" for the recently slain singer. More than 500 radio stations, including one in each Canadian province and American state, plus one in Sydney, Australia played this Dream Network tribute broadcast.

=== Format change and listener rebellion ===
Late in 1988, management at CFNY ordered a change in format. After nearly 13 years of success and popular acclaim as a freestyle rock and alternative radio station, CFNY switched to a primarily Top 40 format and began to identify on-air as FM102. Alternative, which had supported the station for most of its history to that point, was relegated to weekends and late night programming.

In December 1988, then assistant music director Kneale Mann chose to take on hosting the all-night show which remained free-formed. All the music was chosen by Mann and listeners. He hosted the show for the next two years. He came in second in a national competition for his work next to CBC’s Brave New Waves.

This dramatic shift in the daytime format would not be without consequences. Most significantly, the change sparked a rebellion in its fan base. The station's mid-day phone-in request show was inundated with requests for alternative songs. In support of their new policies and format, station management quickly attempted to put a stop to this by ordering that DJs were to refuse all such calls and fulfill only those requests which were for Top 40 music. Not just unpopular with the station's fan base, the new format also resulted in the dismissal or resignation of much of the on-air staff. Perhaps the most notable of these was the resignation of program director Don Berns after only two years in the role, in protest against station management's decisions.

In response, the more devoted of the station's listeners and fans began signing petitions, even going so far as to file an intervention with the CRTC to oppose the station's 1989 licence renewal. Certain radio analyst reports suggested that as many as 100,000 new listeners had been gained by the change, but this masked the fact that the market share dropped considerably, to 4.3%.

=== Revival, evolution, and beginning of the Edge ===
In the summer of 1989, Selkirk was acquired by Maclean-Hunter, which was committed to returning the station to an alternative format. Instead of reviving the old free-form programming, however, Maclean-Hunter hired Reiner Schwarz as program director, with a mandate to tweak the station's programming to create a more conventional modern rock station. In the same year, "Humble" Howard Glassman and Fred Patterson launched the station's new morning show, Humble & Fred, which would go on to receive wide acclaim.

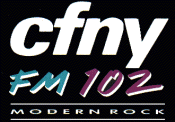
This logo was used when CFNY switched to rock.

In the early 1990s, the station again became an important outlet for new Canadian music, with bands such as Barenaked Ladies, The Lowest of the Low, Rheostatics, and Sloan counting CFNY as their first major radio supporter. However, alternative rock was the dominant commercial genre by this time, so CFNY did not sound as distinctive compared to other radio stations as it once had.

Unfortunately it would also be some time before the changes were effective in resolving the staff morale problems born during the station's recent turbulent years. Schwarz was fired as program director in early 1992, but the most public manifestation of the station's morale woes came in August 1992 when DJ Dani Elwell resigned from the station by reading her résumé live over the air.

In June 1992, with the arrival of the new management team of Vince DiMaggio as general manager and Stewart Meyers as program director, sixteen staff were let go in one day. Those included Scot Turner, Don Berns, Kneale Mann (who would return three years later), Jim Duff, and others.

But the 1990s were also a period of revival and sowing seeds of growth for the station. In addition to the growth of the Humble & Fred morning show, Jason Barr also joined the station at this time and would go on to become a significant contributor to CFNY.

A creation of program director Stewart Meyers, on-air personality Alan Cross launched a new feature on the station in 1993, The Ongoing History of New Music. The program chronicled all manner of history and trivia about the roots of rock music in a quasi-documentary style. Over time the feature would come to be one of the most recognizable and long-running shows on the station, being owned by the station until 2008 and continuing to air new segments up until May 2011, when Cross left the station for other opportunities; it was then revived in 2014 after he returned, and continues to air today.

The mid-1990s were another era of transition for CFNY as station owner Maclean-Hunter was acquired by Rogers Communications in 1994. CFNY was sold to competing telecommunications conglomerate Shaw Communications as a result of the acquisition. During this period, the station dropped its old branding and became 102.1 The Edge. For several years toward the end of the 1990s it was also referred to as Edge 102 before this was dropped in favour of the current usage. On May 1, 1996, the station finally moved from its old studio in Brampton to a new facility at Yonge-Dundas Square along with a street-level studio at 228 Yonge Street in downtown Toronto.

After only four years of ownership, Shaw Communications chose to spin off its radio holdings to Corus Entertainment in 1999. Corus remains CFNY's owner today.

=== Corus Entertainment ===
After 13 years as CFNY's morning show hosts, Howard Glassman and Fred Patterson departed CFNY for CFMJ in April 2001. Taking their place were newcomers Dean Blundell and Todd Shapiro, as well as station regular and Humble & Fred contributor Jason Barr. The new morning show was launched as The Morning Show with Dean Blundell, and later renamed The Dean Blundell Show. This remained the station's morning show until its cancellation in January 2014 broadcasting from 5:30 a.m. until 10 a.m., and was a significant driving force behind many of the station's contests and events. Shapiro was fired from the station on July 24, 2013.

Josie Dye joined the station in 2003 as its new mid-day host, on air from 10 a.m. to 2 p.m. 2002 also saw Derek Welsman join the station as a commercial producer. Welsman was a member of the Dean Blundell morning show until the show was canceled.

In June 2003, assistant program director, music director, and host Kneale Mann left the station to launch CJDV-FM, a new Corus station in Kitchener-Waterloo as program director. He left Corus two years later to launch CILV-FM for Newcap (now Stingray) as program director in Ottawa. Mann left the station in December 2006 and created his own consulting firm which he managed for 14 years. He is now an integrated marketing manager for Central Ontario Broadcasting.

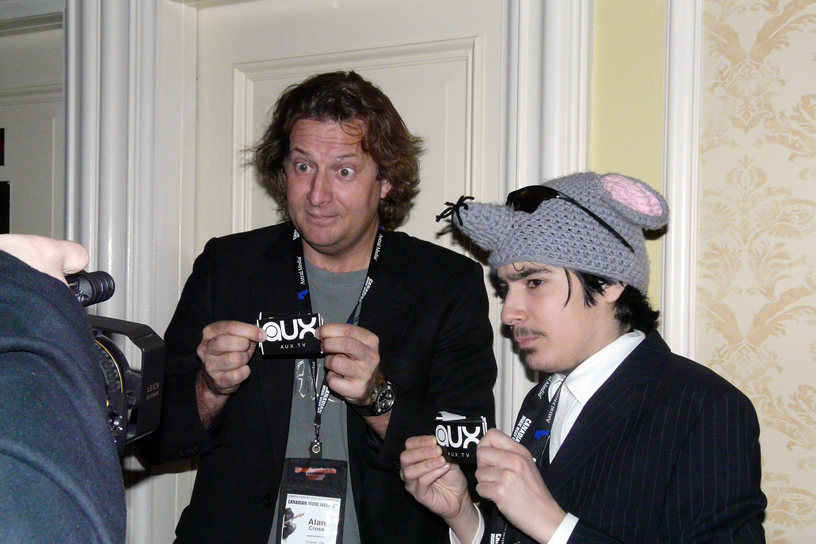
Alan Cross (left), Kayvon (right), March 2009

Alan Cross, host of The Ongoing History of New Music, as well as on-air personality since 1986, departed the station in 2001 to pursue an opportunity as program director at Hamilton-based radio station CJXY-FM for several years. However, in 2004 he returned to the Edge as program director. His tenure as program director for the Edge garnered acclaim for both him and the station, as he was awarded Canadian Program Director of the Year three times—in 2005, 2006, and 2008. Cross returned to the station in 2014 as a programming consultant and to resurrect his popular syndicated show The Ongoing History of New Music.

For a number of years in the 2000s, it became rare that the station would announce its call letters. To most, it was simply 102.1 The Edge. Perhaps due to CRTC regulations requiring radio stations to announce their call letters, the station began in August 2005 to identify itself as both CFNY and the Edge during identification breaks. In 2006, however, the station fell afoul of the CRTC. The regulating body opted to give CFNY only a four-year licence renewal, rather than the customary seven. The regulator's concerns reportedly involved the station failing once to meet its mandated Canadian content targets.

Further staff shake-ups and alterations came with the close of the 2000s. Program director Alan Cross departed the station once more in 2008 to take a position at Corus Entertainment's interactive division, Splice Media. His replacement was former national program director Ross Winters who was fired in July 2013. In May 2009, host Barry Taylor, as well as longtime personality and live-to-air club host Martin Streek were fired for undisclosed reasons. Two months later, Streek took his own life on July 9.

With the departure of Taylor and Streek, host Dave "Bookie" Bookman briefly took over the afternoon drive slot until the Edge hired "Fearless" Fred, a host at Edmonton-based CFBR-FM to take over the position. Fred joined the Edge as afternoon drive host in August 2009, while Bookman moved to the weekday evenings time slot.

Just a year later, in August 2010, Dean Blundell Show co-host Jason Barr was released from his contract and left the station and formed the Biggs & Barr morning show at CHTZ-FM with former Mix 99.9 announcer Chris Biggs. Derek Welsman, former commercial producer and show guest, returned to The Dean Blundell Show after a three-year stint at Astral Media as permanent co-host in November of that year.

On September 13, 2010, the Edge left its longtime home studio at 228 Yonge Street for a new studio at the Corus Quay, at 25 Dockside Drive. The new location is adjacent to Sugar Beach, and across the street from the Kool Haus concert venue.

On December 9, 2012, long-time on-air personality and staple Dave Bookman left the station to join the then-upcoming indie station, CIND-FM, making his on-air debut in September 2013. Bookman died on May 21, 2019, after suffering an aneurysm. Indie 88 paid tribute to him with an entire day of programming devoted to their lost colleague.

==== Staffing changes ====
In August, 2010 cohost Jason Barr left The Dean Blundell Show and CFNY.

On July 24, 2013, it was announced that Todd Shapiro would not be returning to The Dean Blundell Show. The exact reasons have not been made public.

In November 2013, the station faced criticism when Dean Blundell Show cohost Derek Welsman made on-air comments about a criminal trial on which he had been the jury foreman, resulting in allegations both of homophobia—the case involved allegations of sexual assault against a client of a gay bathhouse—and of potentially causing a mistrial by publicly discussing aspects of the jury deliberations. The station announced the show's suspension on December 12, 2013, and the show was ultimately cancelled on January 6, 2014. With the firings of Blundell and Welsman, the station's morning show was taken over by "Fearless" Fred until March 18, 2014, when former CILQ-FM evening show host Dominik Diamond was announced as the morning show's new host.

On March 31, 2014, the station debuted a new weekday schedule. Midday and evening hosts Josie Dye and Greg Beharrell would move to mornings to co-host alongside newcomer Diamond, past host and music programmer Carlos Benevides was re-hired to take over middays, while "Fearless" Fred returned to the afternoon drive slot joined by weekend host Melani Mariani. Longtime swing host Adam was also granted a permanent timeslot, as evening host.

102.1 The Edge logo 2016

This lineup, however, would prove short-lived. The departure of both Beharrell to KITS in San Francisco and Benevides back to mornings at CKBT-FM in Kitchener was followed by the apparent dismissal of Diamond, forcing the station to rearrange its broadcast schedule for the third time in less than a year.

In September 2014, Alan Cross rejoined the station as music consultant and host, relaunching The Ongoing History of New Music and a new weekday programming feature called Adventures in Vinyl. "Spirit of Radio"-era personality Scot Turner, also program director for CJDV-FM and CKBT-FM, rejoined the station as host of Spirit of Radio Sunday, a program which focused on classic alternative rock tracks from the "Spirit of Radio" era in the 1980s. The return of Cross and Turner was intended to draw in younger listeners, as well as older audiences from the "Spirit of Radio" era who were alienated by station's "harder-edged" atmosphere.

Spirit of Radio Sunday became the station's highest-rated program, but was discontinued following its February 1, 2015, edition because it was not sufficiently popular among the station's core 18–34 demographic. Around this time, the station retired its previous slogan ("Toronto's Alternative") and adopted its current one: "Modern Music".

In February 2016, the station announced that former MuchMusic VJ and current ET Canada correspondent Rick Campanelli will join the station as cohost with Fred and Mel of the morning show, beginning June 27.

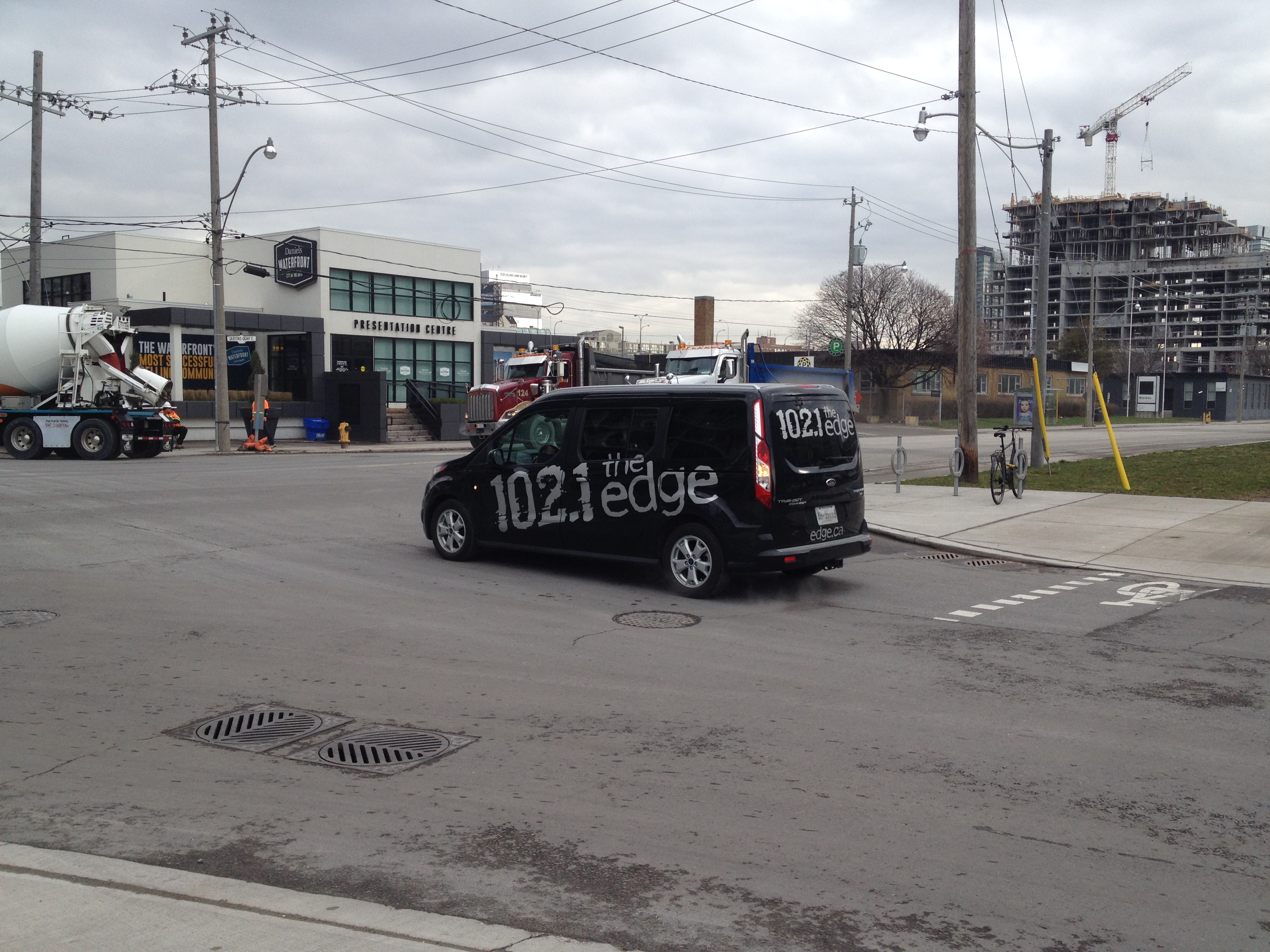
102.1 The Edge van in Toronto.

In November 2018, Kolter Bouchard (ex-CILQ-FM) and Meredith Geddes (ex-CFOX-FM) were announced as the new afternoon drive show, effective immediately. After Geddes left in April 2023 to return to Vancouver and accept a position at CJAX-FM, she was succeeded by Casey-Jo Loos from Vancouver's CFOX-FM as co-host of the afternoon drive show, now called "Kolter & Casey-Jo". Bouchard left the station at the end of March 2024 to become a full-time online content creator. Loos left Corus in a round of company-wide staffing cuts in February 2025.

In January 2020, Ruby and Alex were released and replaced in February 2020 by the morning show team of Shawna, Chris Z and Jay Brody (known collectively as "The B Team") from Hamilton sister station CJXY-FM.

In January 2023, the morning show was taken over by Scott Tucker and Maura Grierson. In November, their show was also added to the schedule of Corus's Jump! 106.9 in Ottawa.

In April 2024 the station launched The Edge Time Machine, a weekly show hosted by Dusty Lalas which looks into the station's history since its inception.

In February 2025, the station announced the addition of Justin Wilcomes, also known as Drex, in the afternoon slot effective March 3. The Drex Show also airs mornings on CFGQ-FM in Calgary.

CFNY: The Spirit of Radio, a documentary film about the station's most influential period in the 1970s and 1980s, was released in January 2026. The documentary includes interviews with CFNY alumni, key disc jockeys and several musicians including Emily Haines (Metric), Deryck Whibley (Sum 41), Peter Hook (New Order), Ben Kowalewicz (Billy Talent), Andy McCluskey (OMD), Steven Page (Barenaked Ladies), Lol Tolhurst (The Cure) and Jim Kerr (Simple Minds).

On April 13, 2026, CFNY flipped from modern rock to classic alternative, now focusing primarily on alternative music from the 1990s and 2000s.

== Studios ==
Prior to 1996, CFNY studios were located in Brampton. The first location was a house at 2 Ellen Street, then to another house 340 Main Street North and finally to a strip plaza at 83 Kennedy Road South.

In 1993, when CFNY was rebranded “CFNY 102.1 The Leading Edge” (later to become 102.1 The Edge), the station built a street-level studio at Bloor Street West and Bathurst Street in Toronto called “The Edge of Bloor and Bathurst.” Shows such as “Live in Toronto,” “The Thursday 30,” and “The All Request Breakfast” broadcast from this studio.

In May 1996, CFNY officially relocated from Brampton to Toronto with broadcast studios and offices moving to the 16th floor of 1 Dundas Street West at the north end of the Eaton Centre. The satellite studio on Bathurst closed and a new one opened at 204 Yonge Street with Sloan as the first band to perform there in a free performance from the second floor above the studio. “The Thursday 30” was recorded from this studio.

In 1999, the 204 Yonge Street studio closed and was temporarily relocated to a broadcast trailer in a park at the corner of Bay Street and Dundas Street West. Notably, the Red Hot Chili Peppers did an interview at the trailer after playing a free outdoor concert for HMV one block away.

CFNY also broadcast from the Hard Rock Centre at Yonge-Dundas Square during this era. In 2000, a new street-level studio opened at 228 Yonge Street and shortly afterward, all radio shows broadcast from that location. The 228 Yonge Street studio hosted appearances by Coldplay, Stone Temple Pilots, U2 and many other bands.

In summer 2010, CFNY/The Edge relocated to Corus Quay on Toronto’s waterfront.

== Availability and international reach ==
102.1 The Edge has long been an international station, as its signal is strong enough that, like many other Toronto radio stations, it is widely available in two of the top fifty media markets in North America. Its signal from Toronto beams from the CN Tower throughout the Buffalo-Niagara Falls New York market, in addition to Toronto.

As a result of these factors, CFNY frequently promotes itself as one of the most listened-to radio stations in the world—the station ranked tenth in a 2002 Arbitron survey of the world's most listened-to Internet radio streams.

== Accolades and awards ==
CFNY-FM and its staff have been the recipients of numerous awards in the station's history.

- The station has been named "Canadian Rock Station of the Year" by the Canadian Music and Broadcast Industry Awards more than two dozen times.
- Former morning show Humble & Fred was voted "Best Morning Show in Canada" four times by the Canadian radio industry.
- Former music director and on-air personality Kneale Mann was twice named Canadian Music Director of Year.
- Former program director Stewart Meyers was named Canadian Program Director of the Year three times.
- Former program director Alan Cross was named Canadian Program Director of the Year three times.
- Afternoon drive host "Fearless" Fred Kennedy won the inaugural 2009 Steve Young Award, recognizing rising Canadian radio stars under the age of 30
- The Dean Blundell Show was awarded 2011's "Top Radio Program (Morning Show)" award by Top Choice Awards

== Contests, events and features ==
=== CASBY Music Awards ===
In 1981, on the program director David Marsden's initiative, CFNY launched the annual U-Know Awards (U-Knows) as a way of recognizing Canadian alternative musical acts ignored by the Top-40 focused mainstream Juno Awards. Following a listener contest in 1985, the ceremony was renamed the CASBY Awards - an acronym for Canadian Artists Selected By You (originally, Chosen As Selected By You). The event, presenting awards to Canadian musicians who have won the most votes from listeners, was held every year until 1996.

The CASBY Awards were then revived in 2002 and held annually until being discontinued following the 2017 edition.

=== Edgefest ===
The Edgefest concert series began in 1987. It was founded by CFNY-FM staffers Kneale Mann, Earl Veale, and Phil Evans as a thank-you gesture to the listeners and as a birthday party to commemorate both the station's tenth birthday and Canada Day. The music festival took place in the years 1987–2006 and 2008–2015, and in that time hosted more than 300 bands and over 500,000 attendees. Edgefest was moved among five locations in the Toronto area; Molson Park in Barrie, Ontario (1987-1992, 1996-2003), the Ontario Place Forum (1993-1994), the Molson Amphitheatre (1995, 2004-2006), Downsview Park (2008-2013), and at the Echo Beach concert venue (2014-2015).

=== Edge Free Money ===
Edge Free Money, originally known as Free Money Month, is a call-in contest run by the station. Every day for a given period of time, a band is selected as the Edge Artist of the Day. The first time that this artist is played on-air, listeners may begin calling in. The 102nd caller to get through wins $1000 from the station. In 2011, Free Money Month actually spanned three months: September, October, and November.

=== Jingle Bell Rock ===
Since 1998, the Edge has run an annual concert series in December of each year. From 1998 to 2008, it was known as the Edge Electric Christmas. Starting in 2009, it began to be billed as Jingle Bell Rock. It is a series of several concerts which are generally in smaller concert venues, although playing in large venues is not unheard-of. A percentage of proceeds from ticket sales are donated to the Daily Bread Food Bank.

=== Rock of Fame ===
The station launched its own hall of fame for notable musicians in summer 2011. This initiative went on hiatus in 2013 as it relied on Dave "Bookie" Bookman's presence in the radio and music industries. It has since been resurrected as of 2023.

- Foo Fighters (inducted August 9, 2011)
- Coldplay (inducted September 21, 2011)
- Red Hot Chili Peppers (inducted April 28, 2012)
- The Offspring (inducted September 2, 2012)
- The Tragically Hip (inducted November 1, 2012)
- The Smashing Pumpkins (inducted October 2023)
- The Black Keys (inducted September 4, 2025)

=== Sausagefest ===
A yearly event which had been held since the start of the Dean Blundell Show, Sausagefest was a summertime backyard barbecue-style event which was typically held at the Sound Academy venue and emceed by the hosts of the show. It featured artists and bands (different each year) performing on the stage inside, while drinks and barbecued food were sold outside. The final Sausagefest was held in the summer of 2012.

== Notable past hosts and staff ==
Name	Position	Date(s)	Notes
Steve Anthony	morning show host	1987–1989	MuchMusic VJ from 1987 to 1995, co-host of Breakfast Television on Citytv from 1989 to 1994, co-host of CP24 Breakfast on CP24 from 2009 to 2018.
Greg Beharrell	evenings, mornings	2013–2014	Currently based in the United States as host of the internationally syndicated Greg Beharrell Show
Kolter Bouchard	afternoon drive co-host	2018–2024	Now an online content creator/internet personality.
Kevin Brauch	mobile correspondent	1988–1990	Became a television presenter
Dean Blundell	morning show on-air host	2001–2014	Became host of Dean Blundell & Co. morning show on CJCL from 2015 to 2017.
Dave Bookman	Indie Hour, weekends, afternoon drive	1991–2012	Joined CIND-FM in 2013, remaining with that station until his death in 2019.
Alan Cross	On-Air Personality; The Ongoing History of New Music; Program Director; Consultant	1986–2001; 2004–2008; 2014–present	Was CJXY-FM program director 2001–2004. Helped launch CIND-FM in 2013. Returned to the Edge in 2014 as music consultant and host of The Ongoing History of New Music.
Raina Douris	on-air personality	2009–2012	Host of NPR's World Cafe in the United States as of October 2019
Josie Dye	mornings, afternoons	2003–2017	Joined Indie 88 in 2017 and is now with CHUM-FM.
"Humble Howard" Glassman	Humble & Fred co-host	1989–1991; 1992–2001	Remains cohost with Fred Patterson of Humble & Fred Show as a syndicated SirusXM radio show and podcast and as a weekend late-night program on CFRB-AM
Ben Kowalewicz	producer, on-air personality	1998–2000	Now vocalist and co-founder of Billy Talent
Fearless Fred	afternoon drive host	2009–2022	Recruited from Power 97 in Winnipeg; became one of the station’s most iconic and longest-serving afternoon personalities. Known for his high-energy delivery and "Fearless" persona, he anchored the afternoon drive for 13 years before moving to sister station Q107. Also a prominent voice actor and comic book writer.
David Marsden	On-Air Personality; Program Director; Director of Operations	1977–1978; 1978–1985; 1985–1988	Later launched Iceberg Radio and programmed an online streaming station at nythespirit.com prior to his death in 2026
Fred Patterson	Humble & Fred co-host	1989–2001	Remains cohost with Howard Glassman of Humble & Fred Show as a syndicated SirusXM radio show and podcast and as a weekend late-night program on CFRB-AM
Chris Sheppard	Club 102 host Music Director	1987–1993	Now producer and music executive
Martin Streek	Thursday 30 host Live-to-Air Host	1984–2009	Died July 9, 2009
George Stroumboulopoulos	On-Air Personality; Live in Toronto host Strombo Show	1996–2001; 2007–2009	MuchMusic VJ from 2000 to 2004, hosted George Stroumboulopoulos Tonight on CBC Television from 2005 to 2014 and Hockey Night in Canada from 2014 to 2016. Later host of The Strombo Show on CBC Radio 2.
Ted Woloshyn	On-Air Personality	1977–1982; 1990–1991	Hosted The Ted Woloshyn Show, mornings on CFRB-AM from 1996 to 2006. Now writes an opinion column in the Toronto Sun and has hosted a weekend program on CFRB since 2010

== See also ==
- List of radio stations in Ontario
