= SiriusXM Canada =

Canadian radio broadcasting company

SiriusXM Canada Holdings Inc.
- Type: Joint venture
- Industry: Broadcasting
- Founded: 2011; 15 years ago
- Headquarters: Toronto, Ontario, Canada
- Key people: Anthony Viner (chairman); Mark Redmond (CEO)
- Products: Satellite radio; Telematics; Internet radio
- Owners: SiriusXM (33.0%); Gary Slaight (33.5%); John Bitove (33.5%)
- Website: www.siriusxm.ca

SiriusXM Canada Holdings Inc. (commonly referred to as SiriusXM Canada) is a Canadian broadcasting company which distributes the services of American satellite radio provider SiriusXM in Canada.

The current company was formed on June 21, 2011, following the Canadian Radio-television and Telecommunications Commission's April 2011 approval to merge the formerly distinct XM Radio Canada and Sirius Canada services. This followed the 2008 merger of XM Satellite Radio and Sirius Satellite Radio in the United States.

Following a subsequent privatization transaction, majority voting control was split between Slaight Communications and John Bitove, two of the primary Canadian investors of the original Sirius Canada and XM Canada services respectively; Slaight Communications' interest was later inherited by Gary Slaight. Due to Canadian broadcasting ownership regulations, the U.S. company Sirius XM Holdings is limited to a 33% voting interest in the Canadian firm, but holds 70% of the equity.

== History ==
=== Predecessors ===
Sirius Canada was a Canadian-based partnership between Slaight Communications, the Canadian Broadcasting Corporation, and U.S.-based Sirius Satellite Radio. XM Satellite Radio Canada was the operating name of Canadian Satellite Radio Holdings Inc., a company formed in 2002 by John Bitove in partnership with Sirius' U.S. competitor, XM Satellite Radio.

Following the receipt of applications in 2003 and 2004, in June 2005, the CRTC issued six-year licenses to three companies to introduce subscription radio service to Canada: Sirius Canada, XM Canada, and a partnership between CHUM Limited and Astral Media. The CHUM/Astral partnership proposed a service fed by terrestrial transmitters instead of satellites, and never launched. Both Sirius Canada and XM Canada launched in late 2005.

=== Merger ===
Following the 2008 merger of Sirius and XM in the U.S., the two Canadian companies did not immediately announce plans to merge, and continued to compete in the Canadian marketplace. A complicating factor in any Canadian merger talks was that Sirius Canada had far more than half of the total satellite radio subscriber base in Canada, and felt they deserved greater than a 50/50 split of the new company, whereas XM Canada felt that their deal with the National Hockey League — a particularly lucrative prize in Canadian sports broadcasting — warranted a larger share of value in the new company than its subscriber base would suggest.

However, in their eventual application to the CRTC, XM Canada and Sirius Canada noted that following the U.S. merger, they found it increasingly difficult to remain in operation as distinct, competing services in Canada even as the parent services increasingly integrated and amalgamated their programming. In an interview with The Globe and Mail before the merger was approved, Bitove also noted the difficulties that arose from the merged American service becoming a minority shareholder in both of the Canadian companies simultaneously, such as conflicts of interest that forced the American company to leave its Canadian partners out of strategic planning discussions which would have given each company power over decisions affecting the other.

On November 24, 2010, XM Radio Canada and Sirius Canada announced that they had reached a deal to merge their services.

John Bitove's Canadian Satellite Radio Holdings Inc. held 30.4% and effective control of the new company. Slaight Communications and the Canadian Broadcasting Corporation (CBC), the primary shareholders in the former Sirius, each held 20.4%, and the American parent Sirius XM held 25%. Both Bitove and Mark Redmond, the former president and CEO of Sirius Canada, hold executive roles with the new company.

As of 2011, Sirius and XM in the United States offered nearly identical programming lineups, with the Canadian-produced channels being among the few remaining distinctions between the two services; eventually the Canadian channels were also harmonized between services. Premier packages became available in Canada on October 1, 2012.

=== 2017 privatization ===
In 2016, Sirius XM Canada, which had had its shares publicly traded on the Toronto Stock Exchange, announced a privatization ("go-private") and recapitalization transaction whereby three of the broadcaster's largest shareholders – Slaight Communications, John Bitove's Obelysk Media, and Sirius XM U.S. – would buy out the remaining public shareholders. The transaction was completed the next year, following CRTC approval, following which Sirius XM took a 70% equity interest in the Canadian firm but only 33% of voting shares, with the remainder split between Slaight and Obelysk.

The CBC exited its ownership position as a result of the transaction, though CBC channels continued to be broadcast on the SiriusXM platform.

=== 2020—present ===
In October 2022, CBC-programmed music channels were removed from SiriusXM and replaced with Canadian music channels programmed directly by SiriusXM Canada; feeds of CBC Radio One and Ici Radio-Canada Première continue to air on SiriusXM.

In October 2024, the CRTC approved the transfer of shares owned by Slaight Communications—owned by Allan Slaight, who died in 2021—directly to Allan's son Gary Slaight.

In March 2025, SiriusXM Canada launched SiriusXM Dhamaka, a South Asian music channel produced in-house, taking over the channel position (796) of the discontinued ATN-Asian Radio, which had been produced by Canadian broadcaster Asian Television Network since 2007.

== Services ==
Sirius XM Canada is the Canadian distributor of the namesake SiriusXM satellite radio and streaming platforms. Officially, Sirius Canada and XM Canada remain separate satellite radio services, though since 2012 operated under a single licence, under the authority of the Canadian Radio-television and Telecommunications Commission (CRTC). This distinction is due to technical differences between the two platforms which may result in minor programming variations between the two services, despite the fact that most programming has been harmonized since the U.S. and Canadian mergers.

As it uses the same infrastructure as SiriusXM U.S., the Canadian service cannot program a full set of channels that adheres to the same Canadian content rules as traditional radio stations. Instead, under the terms of its CRTC licence, SiriusXM Canada must offer a minimum of 10% Canadian-produced channels (i.e., at least one Canadian channel for every nine channels originating from the U.S. or elsewhere) in each of its packages, of which at least one must be an Indigenous channel, and several must be French-language channels. On these channels, at least 85% of musical selections and 85% of spoken-word content must be Canadian content. The service must also make significant ongoing financial contributions to Canadian content development.

From time to time, these rules have resulted in certain American channels being unavailable on satellite radio to SiriusXM Canada subscribers. These channel restrictions do not apply to SiriusXM's streaming platforms, and (subject to program rights conflicts) all are available through the SiriusXM app, as are all of SiriusXM's "Xtra" channels.

Packaging generally mirrors that of the American service. As of April 2024, available plans consist of three tiers of cross-platform (satellite and streaming) channels and functionality, as well as an app-only "All Access" plan. Certain plans include streaming "artist stations", which until late 2023 were branded as being powered by Pandora, a streaming service that is not otherwise available in Canada.

=== Current Canadian channels ===
As of March 2025, the Canadian channels produced or supplied by SiriusXM Canada, ordered by their channel numbers, are as follows. Some channels, particularly those in the 600s and up, may only be available in the SiriusXM app, and/or on SiriusXM's 360L platform (available on select vehicles produced since 2019) which can also stream content through vehicles' cellular data modems.

- Attitude Franco (163) – French-language rock music
- Mixtape North (164) – Canadian hip-hop and R&B
- The Indigiverse (165) – Indigenous music and talk programming
- Racines Musicales (166) – "homegrown" French-language and Indigenous music
- Canada Talks (167) – Canadian talk radio
- SiriusXM Comedy Club (168) – Canadian stand-up comedy sets
- CBC Radio One (169) – English-language public radio; special satellite radio feed
- Ici Radio-Canada Première (170) – French-language public radio; simulcast of CBF-FM Montreal
- Top of the Country Radio (171) – Canadian country music
- SiriusXM Scoreboard (172) – continuous sports results service
- The Verge (173) – Canadian alternative and indie rock
- Influence Franco (174) – French-language alternative and indie music
- North Americana (359) – Americana and roots music
- Noël Incontournable (640) – French-language Christmas and holiday music (available throughout the year)
- Poplandia (754) – Canadian pop hits of the 1990s and 2000s
- Les Tubes 80-90 (756) – French-language 1980s-90s pop-rock hits
- The Tragically Hip Radio (757) – devoted to the music of The Tragically Hip and associated acts and influences
- Iceberg (758) – Canadian rock music
- Les Tubes Franco (759) – French-language hit music
- SiriusXM Dhamaka (796) – South Asian music

== See also ==
- List of Sirius XM Radio channels
