= Alan Cross =

Canadian radio broadcaster

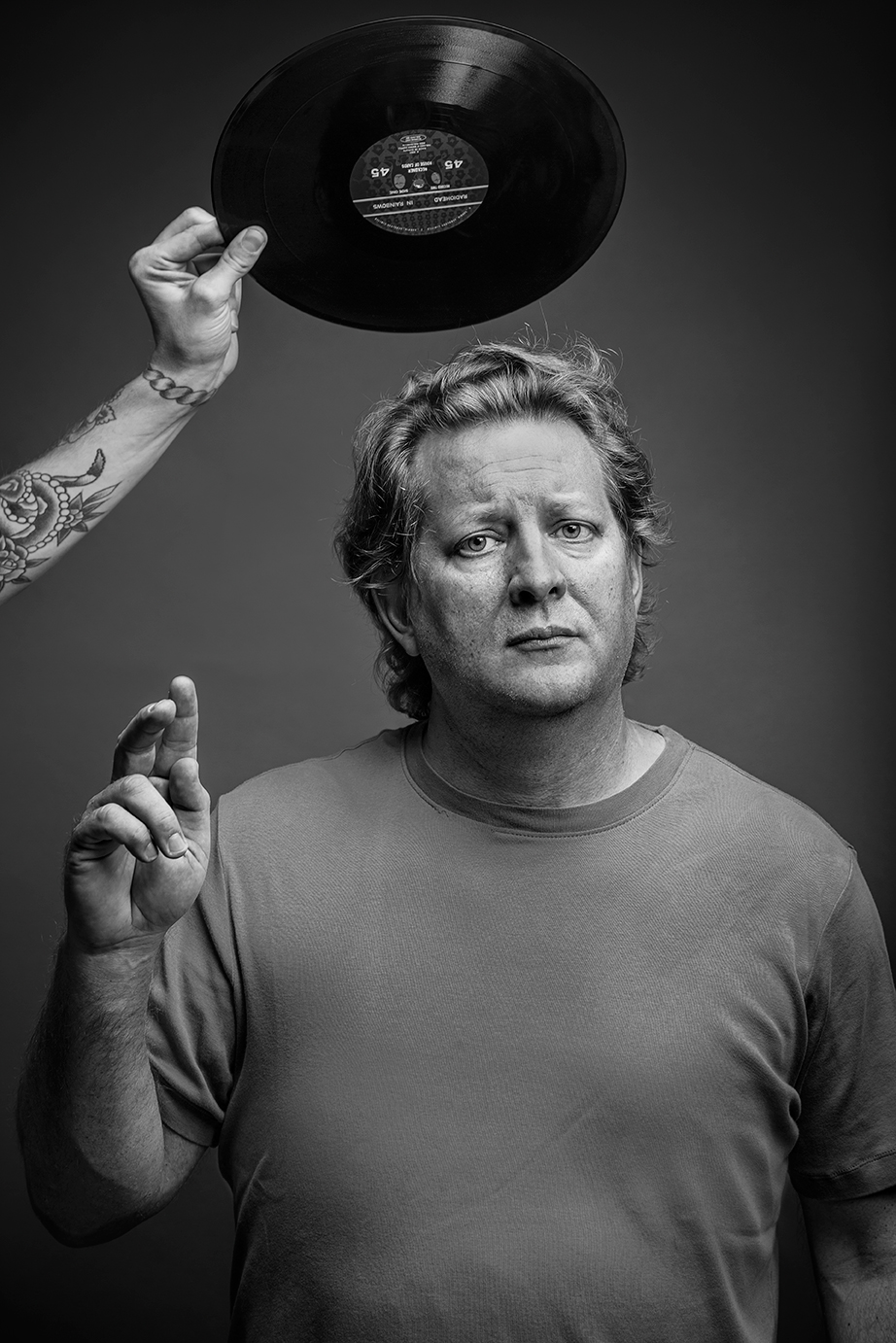
- Born: Stonewall, Manitoba, Canada
- Education: University of Winnipeg
- Occupation: Radio broadcaster
- Years active: 1980–present
- Employer: Corus Entertainment
- Website: AlanCross.ca

Alan Cross (born Krawec) is a Canadian radio broadcaster and a writer on music. Based in Toronto, Ontario, he is best known nationally and internationally as host of the syndicated radio series The Ongoing History of New Music, The Secret History of Rock, and ExploreMusic. In 2013, he started the Geeks & Beats podcast with BNN's Michael Hainsworth.

== Background ==
Originally from the small prairie town of Stonewall, Manitoba, Cross began his radio career with the University of Winnipeg's campus radio station, CKUW, in 1980. He subsequently joined radio stations in Selkirk, Kenora and Brandon before returning to Winnipeg's CHIQ.

== Career ==
He joined CFNY on October 3, 1986, as an overnight announcer.

In 1989, Cross became the station's afternoon drive-time host. The following year, he moved to the 10 a.m.-2 p.m. slot; in 1993, he returned to afternoon drive and remained there until 2001. Beginning in February 1993, he also became host of The Ongoing History of New Music.

Cross left CFNY in 2001 to become program director of CJXY in Hamilton, where he oversaw the station's frequency switch to become Y108. During this time he continued to host The Ongoing History of New Music. He subsequently returned to CFNY as program director in mid-January 2004, remaining in that role until moving to Corus Entertainment's interactive media division, Splice Media (now called Corus Interactive and Integrated Solutions), in 2008 to launch the ExploreMusic project — although CFNY still aired The Ongoing History of New Music until 2011. He also hosted the television program ExploreMusic on aux.tv.

Cross left Corus Entertainment in early July 2011, after the company restructured their online content department. In an interview with the Toronto Star, Cross said that there was no ill will between himself and Corus. Cross' departure effectively brought an end to The Ongoing History of New Music, because Corus Entertainment owned the show.

He then began working on a different show, The Secret History of Rock, for Astral Media. In 2013, he joined Rock95 Broadcasting's new CIND-FM as a music consultant and part-time on-air personality. Throughout this era, Cross also maintained his own personal music blog, A Journal of Musical Things; in 2009, he attracted international attention when he became the first music critic in the world to post an advance review of U2's new single "Get On Your Boots".

In 2014, he was named as the head of music curation for Songza's operations in Canada, and curated a museum exhibition on the science of rock music for the Ontario Science Centre. In the fall of that year, he returned to CFNY and relaunched The Ongoing History of New Music, as well as a new weekday programming feature called Adventures in Vinyl. In 2015, he formed the company Major League Mixes with colleague Dave Charles; the company currently holds the contract for game music at Toronto Maple Leafs games.

== Personal life ==
Cross is married to Mary Ellen Beninger, a journalist who has been associated with the Toronto radio stations CFNY, CFTR and CHFI.

== Books ==
- The Alternative Music Almanac (1995)
- The Making of Pretty Hate Machine and The Downward Spiral (1996)
- Over the Edge: The Revolution and Evolution of New Rock (1997)
- 20th Century Rock and Roll: Alternative Rock (2000)
- The History of Alternative Rock, volumes 1-4 (audio book series)
- The Science of Song How and Why We Make Music
