= SiriusXM Comedy Club =

Canadian satellite radio channel

- Canada
- Broadcast area: Canada, United States
- Frequency: SiriusXM 168

Programming
- Format: Canadian stand-up comedy

Ownership
- Owner: SiriusXM Canada

History
- First air date: November 17, 2005
- Former names: Laugh Attach (2005–2013); Canada Laughs (2013–2019); Just for Laughs Radio (2019); Just for Laughs Canada (2019–2023)

Technical information
- Class: satellite radio station

Links
- Website: SiriusXM Comedy Club

SiriusXM Comedy Club is a Sirius XM Radio channel featuring uncensored comedy from Canada. It was created in November 2005 as a result of the Canadian Radio-television and Telecommunications Commission's (CRTC) regulations for Canadian content on the XM Radio Canada platform, originally as Laugh Attack until 2013 and then as Canada Laughs from 2013 to 2019.

In conjunction with the Just for Laughs comedy festival, the channel was rebranded as Just for Laughs Radio on February 25, 2019 (and shortly thereafter to Just for Laughs Canada) and broadcast content from Just for Laughs events as well as independent content by Canadian comics.

In early 2024, the channel quietly dropped its affiliation with Just for Laughs and rebranded again, this time as SiriusXM Comedy Club.

== History ==
Logo as Canada Laughs.

As Canada Laughs, the channel featured uncensored Canadian stand-up and sketch comedy.

This channel, The Verge, Radio Parallèle, and/or ATN-Asian Radio were sometimes preempted by XM Radio Canada in order to air extra NHL play-by-play on channels 235 - 239.

Laugh Attack was not added to Sirius after the Sirius/XM merger in 2008, as the Canadian Sirius and XM affiliates did not merge until 2011.

Laugh Attack was renamed "Canada Laughs" and made available on Sirius and XM in May 2013.

=== Rebranding as Just for Laughs ===
In February 2019, SiriusXM announced a branding deal with the Just for Laughs comedy festival, which would see the channel rebranded as "Just for Laughs Radio", and the programming extended to include archival comedy performances from the Just for Laughs library. The rebranding was heavily criticized by Canadian comedians, as the archive content would include performances by international comedians, and would vastly reduce the amount of airtime for content from Canadian comedians. Many comedians noted that their royalties from Canada Laughs airplay were their single largest and most reliable comedy-related income source.

On February 27, in response to the criticism, SiriusXM and Just for Laughs announced that the channel would return to its previous format under the amended name "Just for Laughs Canada", focusing exclusively on Canadian comedians.

Following the end of the SiriusXM–Just for Laughs partnership in 2024, the original archive-based concept of Just for Laughs Radio was revisited in April 2026 for a new streaming channel on TuneIn, the latter having been acquired in late 2025 by Montreal-based Stingray Group.
