= HaBonim =

HaBonim or Habonim (Hebrew: הַבּוֹנִים) may refer to:

- Congregation Habonim, New York
- Congregation Habonim Toronto
- Habonim Dror, a Socialist-Zionist youth movement
- HaBonim, Israel, a moshav in Israel
