= Esther Ghan Firestone =

Esther Ghan Firestone (1925 – 28 May 2015) was the first female cantor in Canada, although she was not ordained. She began as a cantor in the mid-1950s at Toronto’s Temple Beth-El, and worked in Toronto at Temple Beth-El (mid-1950s to mid-1960s), Temple Emanu-El (1977), and later at Congregation Habonim Toronto from 1985 until some time in 2015. She was also a member of Kol Nashim (Hebrew for “All Women”), a sextet of female lay cantors founded in 1987.

Aside from her cantorial work, she was a singer; after training as a pianist in Winnipeg and giving several recitals in Manitoba, she began voice studies in 1944 in Toronto with Nina de Gedeonoff and at the TCM with Emmy Heim. In 1948 she won second prize in an international scholarship contest sponsored by Carnegie Hall. Her first recital in Toronto was in 1950 at what was then called Eaton Auditorium (now the Carlu), with her uncle accompanying her on violin. She later sang on CBC Radio’s Canadian Cavalcade from 1949 to 1951, and on its Stardust program between 1957 and 1960. In 1951, she made her operatic debut with the CBC Opera Company, playing Musetta in Puccini’s La Bohème; she also performed with the Toronto Symphony Orchestra and the Buffalo Philharmonic Orchestra, and in concerts at the CNE Bandshell. She also worked as a choirmaster and arranger of music, most notably of an Israeli-Canadian peace song, Lay Down Your Arms. She also conducted the YMHA Choral Group, the Toronto Hadassah Women's Choir (1967-74), and the J.C.C. Singers (1980s), who recorded folk songs in 1984. In 1971 and 1973, with three of her children, she recorded Let's Sing English Songs, a collection of 52 songs for distribution in Japan by the Tokyo Kodomo Club. She was also co-founder (along with Eli Rubenstein) and conductor of the Habonim Youth Choir.

== Biography ==
She was born as Esther Cohen, and her mother's maiden name was Ghan. Her mother had fled to Canada to escape the pogroms in Ukraine, where she had been imprisoned and assaulted and had faced great poverty. Esther's uncle suggested she adopt the stage name of Esther Ghan for the sake of her career. She later married Paul Firestone and had six children: Debbie, Shawn, Jay, Danny, Ari and Hillary; Hillary died of ovarian cancer in 2009.
