= Lay Down Your Arms =

Lay Down Your Arms may refer to:

== Literature ==
- Lay Down Your Arms! (novel), English title of the 1889 novel Die Waffen Nieder! by Bertha von Suttner

== Music ==
- "Lay Down Your Arms" (1956 song), a popular song in Swedish, then in English with many covers, most notably The Chordettes and Anne Shelton
- "Lay Down Your Arms" (The Graces song), notably covered by Belinda Carlisle
- "Lay Down Your Arms" (Doron Levinson song), a peace song by Israeli Doron Levinson in Hebrew and later on in English
- "Lay Down Your Arms", a song by Asia from their 1992 album Aqua
- "Lay Down Your Arms", a song by Per Gessle from The World According to Gessle
- "Lay Down Your Arms", a song by The 69 Eyes from their album Wasting the Dawn. The song features Ville Valo
- "Lay Down Your Arms", a song by Tim Christensen from his album Honeyburst

Also

- "Soldier of Love (Lay Down Your Arms)", a song originally recorded by Arthur Alexander, covered by several artists
- "The Tea Leaf Prophecy (Lay Down Your Arms)", a song by Joni Mitchell from her album Chalk Mark in a Rain Storm

== Plays ==
- Lay Down Your Arms, 1970 British television play written by Dennis Potter and directed by Christopher Morahan, set during the Suez crisis
