= Tara Strong =

Canadian-American actress (born 1973)

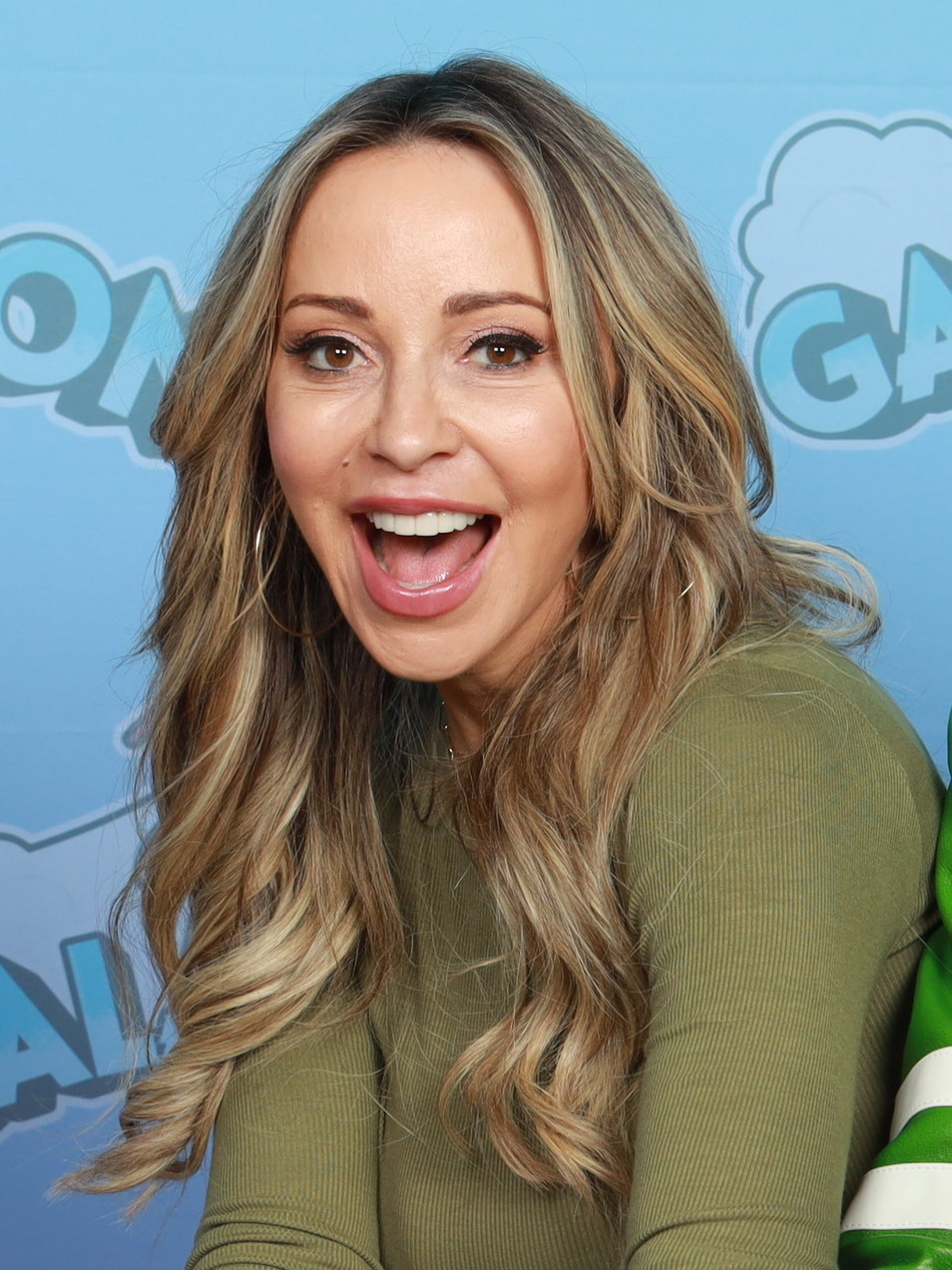
- Strong at GalaxyCon Richmond, Virginia in 2026
- Born: Tara Lyn Charendoff; February 12, 1973 (age 53); Toronto, Ontario, Canada
- Citizenship: Canada; United States
- Occupation: Actress
- Years active: 1986–present
- Spouse: Craig Strong (m. 2000; div. 2022)
- Partner: Willie Morris (2022–present)
- Children: 2

Tara Lyn Strong (née Charendoff; born February 12, 1973) is a Canadian-American actress. She is known for her voice work in animation, websites, and video games. Strong's voice roles include animated series such as The Powerpuff Girls, The Fairly OddParents, My Little Pony: Friendship Is Magic, Teen Titans, Xiaolin Showdown, Ben 10, Drawn Together, The New Batman Adventures, Rugrats, The Proud Family, Chowder, Wow! Wow! Wubbzy!, Unikitty!, and DC Super Hero Girls. She has also voiced characters in the video games Mortal Kombat X, Ultimate Marvel vs. Capcom 3, Jak and Daxter, Final Fantasy X, Final Fantasy X-2, Blue Dragon, and Batman: Arkham. Strong's work on Final Fantasy X-2 earned her an award from the Academy of Interactive Arts & Sciences.

== Early life ==
Strong was born as Tara Lyn Charendoff in Toronto, Ontario, on February 12, 1973, the younger daughter of Syd and Lucy Charendoff. She was raised in Toronto with her older sister, Marla. Her parents were of Russian-Jewish ancestry, and Strong has said that her grandparents came to Canada after fleeing pogroms in Russia. She has described her Jewish heritage as "a big part of her identity". Her grandfather was a cantor, while her grandmother operated a catering business at Toronto's Beth Radom Congregation.

Strong has recalled that she was interested in performing from an early age. At four, she volunteered to perform a solo in a school production, an experience that encouraged her interest in acting and singing. She subsequently participated in Toronto's Jewish and Yiddish theatrical community. Although she spoke Hebrew rather than Yiddish, she learned her Yiddish lines phonetically and performed for Yiddish-speaking audiences. She also performed with the Toronto Jewish Theater in A Night of Stars and participated in a recording of "Lay Down Your Arms" with the Habonim Youth Choir, singing the song in both English and Hebrew.

Her family also had a connection to the retail business. Her parents operated a Toronto toy and candy store called The Wiz, which Strong has recalled as an early seller of Hello Kitty merchandise in Canada. She later described seeing her father in a Hello Kitty costume when she was a child, years before she herself was cast as the character. Strong has also recalled that her parents supported her interest in performing and that she attended acting, singing, and dancing classes while growing up in Toronto.

By her early teens, Strong was pursuing acting professionally. She obtained an agent at age 13 and, that year, was cast as Gracie in the Limelight Theatre's production of The Music Man, which she has identified as her first professional stage role. Around the same period, she appeared as a guest on the television series T. and T., starring Mr. T, and began obtaining work in animation. Her first major animated role was the title character in Hello Kitty's Furry Tale Theater, which aired in 1987. Strong was credited as Tara Charendoff on the series.

Strong later recalled that beginning professional acting while still in school made balancing her education and career difficult. She attended several schools and sometimes received instruction from on-set tutors while continuing to work, but remained determined to complete high school and graduated with her peers. During her Toronto years, she also studied improvisation and sketch comedy at The Second City's Toronto operation, further developing the performance skills that later became part of her work in animation and voice acting.

Strong continued working in Canadian television, film, theatre, and animation during her adolescence and early adulthood. Before leaving Canada, she had accumulated a range of acting and voice roles, including work on animated productions such as Beetlejuice, Care Bears, and The Garbage Pail Kids, as well as live-action work and the CBC sitcom Mosquito Lake. She moved to Los Angeles in January 1994, after establishing herself professionally in Toronto.

== Career ==
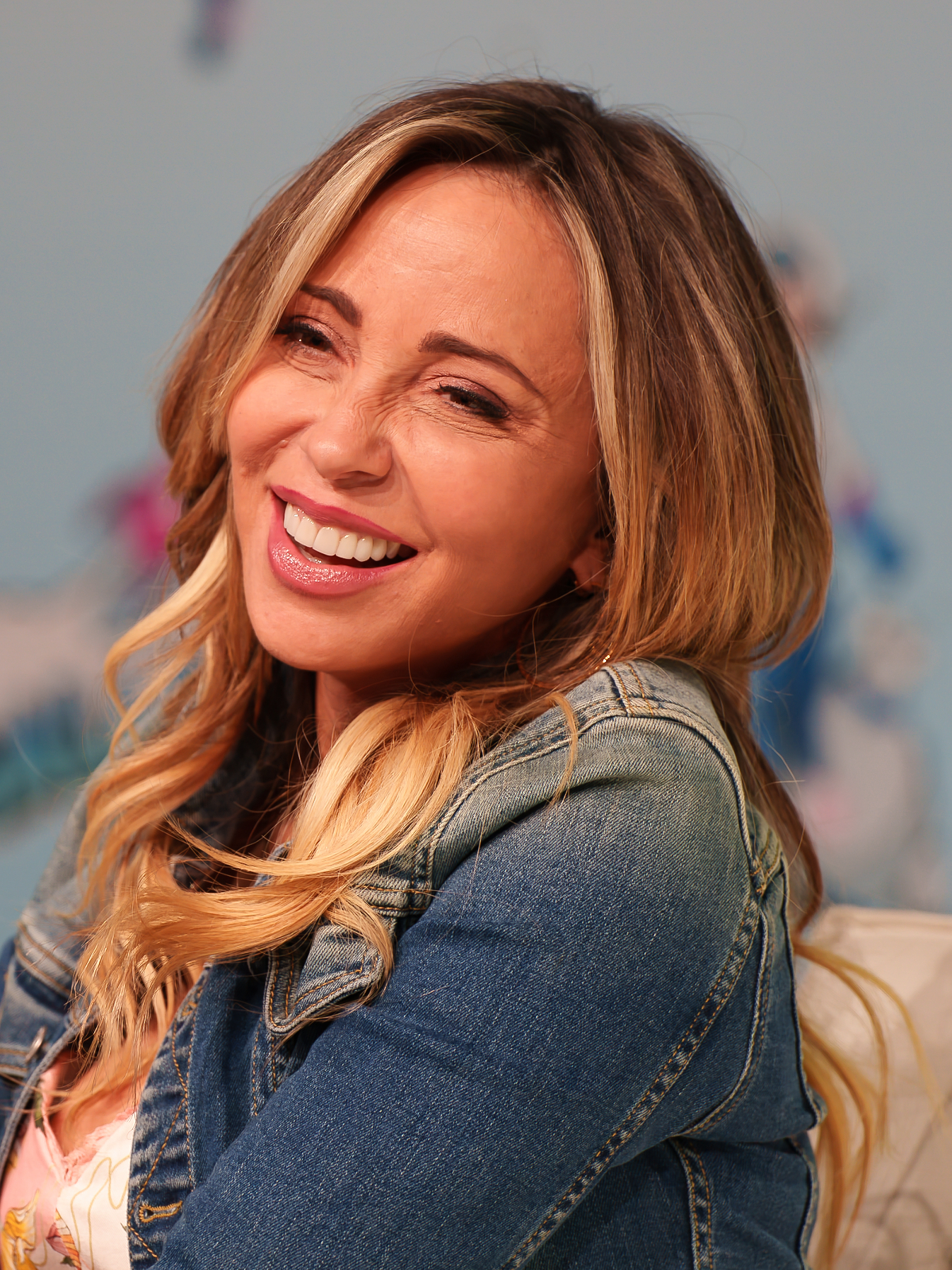
Strong at GalaxyCon Raleigh in 2024

Strong's first professional role was Gracie in Limelight Theater's production of The Music Man at the age of 13. She had a guest role in the action series T. and T. Her first major voice role, also at the age of 13, was the title role in Hello Kitty's Furry Tale Theater. Strong starred in the short-lived CBC Television sitcom Mosquito Lake. She took improv classes at The Second City in Toronto and continued acting in both animated and live-action shows and films, before moving to Los Angeles in January 1994.

Strong is the voice of numerous animated characters, including main roles in The New Batman Adventures as Barbara Gordon / Batgirl, Teen Titans and Teen Titans Go! as Raven; Fillmore! as Ingrid Third; The Fairly OddParents as Timmy Turner (Strong took over the role after the suicide of the original voice actress Mary Kay Bergman—the two were close friends) and Poof; Rugrats and All Grown Up! as Dil Pickles; The Powerpuff Girls as Bubbles; Ben 10 as Ben Tennyson, Upgrade, Blitzwolfer, and Buzzshock; Chowder as Truffles; Foster's Home for Imaginary Friends as Terrence; the singing voice of Meg Griffin and additional voices on Family Guy; My Little Pony: Friendship Is Magic as Twilight Sparkle, Unikitty! as the titular princess, Wow! Wow! Wubbzy! as Daizy, and Dorothy and the Wizard of Oz as Joanni.

While recording lines for her role as Dil in Rugrats, one scene's script for Strong's character prompted her to make crying noises. During the taping, the producers suddenly paused and revealed to Strong that her voice acting of a child had been so realistic that she had inadvertently made a woman in the studio lactate. As the role was otherwise going to be offered to Madonna, Strong subsequently quipped that she was proud that the incident led to her keeping the role.

Strong has also lent her voice to English-dubbed localizations of Japanese anime such as Spirited Away and Princess Mononoke, as well as several video games, including her work as Elisa and Ursula in Metal Gear Solid: Portable Ops; Paz Ortega Andrade in Metal Gear Solid: Peace Walker, Metal Gear Solid V: Ground Zeroes, and Metal Gear Solid V: The Phantom Pain; Rikku in Final Fantasy X, its sequel Final Fantasy X-2, and Kingdom Hearts II; Krista Sparks in Twisted Metal: Head-On; Talwyn Apogee in Ratchet & Clank Future: Tools of Destruction and its sequel, Ratchet & Clank Future: Quest for Booty; Keira in Jak and Daxter; and Juliet Starling, the main character of Lollipop Chainsaw. She also has a minor voiceover for the teddy bear Ted in the motion picture Ted. In Blue Dragon, she is the voice actress for Kluke for the Xbox 360 game, but not in the anime series. Beginning with the video game Batman: Arkham City, Strong would also succeed Arleen Sorkin as the voice of Harley Quinn. In January 2013, she voiced the character Plum in Cartoon Hangover's Bravest Warriors, created by Pendleton Ward. She also voiced Miss Minutes in the live-action Marvel Cinematic Universe series Loki.

Besides her voice over works, Strong has appeared in live-action roles such as National Lampoon's Senior Trip, Sabrina Goes to Rome, Sabrina Down Under, and The Last White Dishwasher. She also made guest appearances on shows such as Forever Knight, Street Legal, Touched by an Angel, Take Home Chef, Party of Five, Comic Book: The Movie, Kung Fu: The Legend Continues, 3rd Rock from the Sun, and The Drew Carey Show. She recurred as Miss Collins in Nickelodeon's live-action series Big Time Rush from 2010 to 2013 and starred in the Canadian series Pretty Hard Cases as Tiggy Sullivan, the head of a drug trafficking gang.

In 2004, Strong won an Interactive Achievement Award for her role as Rikku in Final Fantasy X-2. In 2006, she was nominated for the Daytime Emmy Award for Outstanding Performer in an Animated Program for her role as Dannan in Jakers! The Adventures of Piggley Winks but lost to her co-star, Maile Flanagan, who played the title character. Strong has also been nominated five times for Best Voice Acting at the Annie Awards. In 2013, Strong won the Shorty Awards for "Best Actress" for her use of social media. The Behind the Voice Actors website selected her for BTVA Voice Acting Award for Voice Actress of the Year in 2013, having also nominated her for 2011 and 2012.

Strong served as the announcer for the 1999 Kids' Choice Awards, appeared as a guest panelist at several fan conventions (including BotCon, JaCon, San Diego Comic-Con, and Anime Overdose, and was featured on the front cover of the July/August 2004 issue of Working Mother magazine, in which she said, "My son is now old enough to respond to my work. To me, that's what it is all about."

== Political views and activism ==
Strong has participated in charitable activities and fan-organized fundraising. In connection with the My Little Pony: Friendship Is Magic fandom, in 2012, during the BronyCon event in New Jersey, she attended a lunch with fans from the military. In 2013, she was involved with a charity group called Bronies for Good, helping them raise funds for a family whose daughter had a brain tumour.

Strong is vegan. In 2013, she helped raise funds for a new veterinary suite at the Wildlife Learning Center in Sylmar, Los Angeles.

Strong is a Democrat. In November 2018, Strong and actress Rena Sofer accused an Uber driver of abuse after he learned of their political affiliation; the driver was subsequently suspended by Uber. In July 2019, Strong participated in a Lights for Liberty demonstration in Los Angeles, which protested Donald Trump's immigration policy.

In 2026, Strong wrote an essay for The Jerusalem Post, published in collaboration with the International March of the Living, reflecting on her experience as a Canadian student participant in the 1990 March of the Living. She recalled being present at Auschwitz-Birkenau during an address by Elie Wiesel, when Wiesel stopped speaking after beginning a story about a young girl he remembered from Auschwitz. Strong wrote that members of the Toronto March of the Living student choir, including herself, then began singing Hannah Senesh's "Eli, Eli," with thousands of participants joining in. Strong connected the memory to her later public statements on Jewish identity, Holocaust remembrance, and speaking out against antisemitism. Eli Rubenstein's March of the Living article "The Day Words Failed Elie Wiesel" documents the 1990 March of the Living ceremony at Auschwitz-Birkenau and states that Rabbi Yisrael Meir Lau called upon the Toronto March of the Living student choir, which included Tara Charendoff and others.

Strong wrote about a "new silence" when it comes to 2020s antisemitism, and that following October 7th, she had been disappointed by the reluctance of some colleagues, friends, public figures, women's organizations, and even some Jews to speak publicly against antisemitism or in support of Jewish victims. Strong connected this silence to the central message of March of the Living, "Never Forget" and "Never Again", arguing that "Never Again Is Now" and that the lessons of the program required people to use their voices against hatred.

=== Israel ===
Strong has been a vocal supporter of Israel since the 2023 October 7 attacks. She was fired from the independent animated series Boxtown after she created, shared and liked several Islamophobic and anti-Palestinian social media posts, including liking a tweet that equated all Muslims to Hamas and ISIS, and sharing a tweet from Mohammad Tawhidi (who calls himself the "Imam of Peace") claiming that pro-Palestinian protests were supportive of "terrorism, beheadings, kidnappings, rape, and the execution of hostages" and a screenshot from the Middle East Media and Research Institute (MEMRI), which claimed Hamas would take over the world. Bandit Mill Animation, the studio behind Boxtown, issued a statement explaining that "This decision was due to a trend among Tara's recent online activity, including posts that promote controversial messages regarding the peoples of Palestine currently being affected by the ongoing Israel-Palestine crisis... This was not a difficult decision." Strong subsequently claimed she was "fired for being Jewish."

In 2024, Strong signed an open letter denouncing filmmaker Jonathan Glazer's Oscar speech for The Zone of Interest, in which he criticized the dehumanization of victims of "the ongoing attack on Gaza" and an open letter by StopAntisemitism, StandWithUs, End Jew Hatred, and 2024 New Voices urging Joe Biden and Kamala Harris to "protect and support" Israel and secure the release of hostages taken by Hamas.

== Personal life ==
In 1999, Strong met American actor and real estate agent Craig Strong. The couple married on May 14, 2000, and had two sons, born February 2002 and August 2004.

The family lived in the Los Angeles area, where Strong and Craig were also involved in the voice-over industry. They co-founded VoiceStarz, an online business that provided educational material and instruction for people interested in pursuing voice-over work. The couple also developed a line of baby bottles designed with caps that could be marked with a date to indicate when stored breast milk had been collected.

Strong's family life was occasionally discussed in interviews alongside her professional work. She has described balancing motherhood with a demanding voice-acting schedule, which often involved recording sessions for several productions in the same period. In interviews, she has also spoken about the importance of maintaining a close relationship with her sons as they grew older.

Strong and Craig Strong separated in 2019. She filed for divorce on July 24, 2019, and their marriage ended on January 5, 2022.

Following the divorce, Strong began a relationship with social-media entrepreneur Willie Morris in 2022. Morris had worked with Fanmio, a company involved in virtual fan and entertainment events, and Strong has said that the two initially communicated online before beginning a romantic relationship. Morris operates Happy Goat Farm, a nonprofit agricultural project near Yosemite that Strong has described as keeping goats for vegetation and fire-brush management while also growing food for distribution to the local community.

Strong has also been an advocate for animal welfare and follows a vegan diet. She has said that she became vegetarian as a child after an experience involving an animal at the Royal Winter Fair in Toronto, and later adopted a vegan diet after discussions with her sons about the dairy industry. In interviews, she has connected her veganism with her longstanding concern for animals and has spoken publicly about animal welfare.

Her Jewish identity has remained an important part of her public life. Strong has discussed her Jewish upbringing and heritage in interviews, and in later years she has combined discussions of Jewish identity with advocacy concerning animal welfare and other causes.
