= Eitz Chaim Schools =

Location
- Toronto, Ontario; Canada; 43.80234°N 79.44382°W

Information
- Type: Elementary
- Established: 1915
- Principal: Rabbi Mordechai Loiterman
- Grades: Pre Nursery - 8
- Enrollment: 200
- Website: eitzchaim.com

Eitz Chaim Schools (Hebrew: ישיבת עץ חיים) is a private, Orthodox Jewish elementary school in Toronto and Thornhill, Ontario, Canada. The school receives funding from the UJA Federation of Greater Toronto, primarily based on the amount of tuition subsidies provided. In addition to the regular Ontario curriculum, the school teaches various Jewish-related topics including Chumash, Mishna, and Dinim. Some Hebrew language and Navi, is also taught, particularly with the girls.

== History ==
The school was first established in 1915, after the arrival from Poland of Rabbi Yehudah Yudel Rosenberg, under the name Poylishe Talmud Torah and was located at the Beth Jacob Congregation on Elm Street, which had formerly been a church. The school's first building on Chestnut Street was inaugurated in August 1916, with additional classes held at a branch on Simcoe Street. Poylishe Talmud Torah was then renamed Talmud Torah Eitz Chaim because the name was more inclusive to all Orthodox Jews.

In 1917, due to rapidly increasing enrollment, Eitz Chaim purchased the Italian Club at 68 D’Arcy Street. In 1926, a separate girls’ class was formed and the first female teacher was hired; before then, the school had been all boys. In 1927, the building was destroyed by a fire, and a new, larger building was constructed on the same site. The new building was dedicated on December 30, 1927. After the dedication of the new building, enrollment increased dramatically. In 1929, the school had 300 students, and it grew to 400 in 1931, 503 in 1933, and 600 in 1938. By the early 2000s, the population of the school was hovering around 1,000 students. Today the school has an enrollment of nearly 700 students and has seen increased enrollment since the arrival of Rabbi Mordechai Loiterman, current Head of School. In 1942, the school started a kindergarten. In 1956, the Torath Emeth Jewish Center, an Orthodox Synagogue, was established at 1 Viewmount Avenue. By 1958, in response to the geographical shift of the Jewish population northward, the Tanenbaum Building was added to the complex, followed by the Korolnek Building in 1961, both at 1 Viewmount Avenue, for the school. Eitz Chaim's girls campus exists at that address to date. In 1966, the Board of Directors, with much help in particular from Mr. A. Bleeman, purchased land at the intersection of Patricia and Bathurst Street. The Patricia campus served as the temporary location for portable units until the large, permanent building was completed in 1970. The former D'Arcy Street building was demolished in 1967 to construct St. Patrick Catholic Elementary School to replace their nearby Beverly Street building; though it later became a high school in 1986 before moving eastward three years later and it is now the current home of Heydon Park Secondary School since 2000.

The campus was Eitz Chaim's business office and only boys' campus until 2020. Congregation Minyan Sephard, a sephardi minyan, was also housed in the Patricia campus on Shabbat and Jewish Holidays. Eitz Chaim's Spring Farm campus in Thornhill, named for the farm formerly on that site, opened its doors in 1988. In the campus's early days, many people were skeptical that it would be well-attended, but in 2016, enrollment was so high that the school built four mobile classroom units behind the building. In 2020, the campus was converted from a girl's campus to a boy's campus, with Viewmount remaining as the only girl's campus.

As mentioned, in the beginning of the 2018–2019 school year, it was announced that due to extreme financial distress, the Patricia branch would be sold, with the boys being relocated to the Spring Farm Campus starting in September 2020, and both girls' campuses being merged and moved to Viewmount for the 2019–2020 school year. The School announced they would maintain a co-ed preschool and a Girls' Grade 1 at Spring Farm and began discussions to begin an exciting construction project together with Kollel Ohr Yosef. The Patricia campus was purchased by the Toronto Cheder.

== Education style ==
In 2005, Eitz Chaim implemented two tracks that boys have the option of choosing: Maharal or Traditional. The Maharal track followed the education style of the Maharal. During the time of the Maharal, children were taught subjects like Gemara from a very young age. The Maharal strongly believed that this was wrong and that children should only be taught according to their intellectual maturity, and only if the child is developmentally capable of fully comprehending what he is being taught. Therefore, boys in the Maharal track started learning Gemara in the beginning of grade six. Boys in the traditional track followed traditional Jewish education methods, for example, starting Gemara in the beginning of grade five. In 2019, the administration announced the Maharal and Traditional tracks would be merging.

== Graduates ==
In its early days, upon graduating Eitz Chaim, the boys usually continued on to Jewish high schools, and the girls tended to move on to public high schools. In more recent years, however, upon completing grade 8, the boys and girls continue to various Yeshivas and Girls Orthodox High Schools in the community.

== Financial struggles ==
Eitz Chaim Schools had announced that their decision to sell the Patricia facility was due to financial struggles faced by the school. In the last couple years the deficit has been brought closer to $300,000 and their fundraising has grown by $500,000. is A review of data provided by the Canada Revenue Agency demonstrates that Eitz Chaim has been in deficit, losing $11M over five years.

Data from Canada Revenue Agency
	Revenue	Expense	Loss
2015	$12,718,989	$12,974,893	-$255,904
2016	$11,586,252	$13,752,987	-$2,166,735
2017	$12,238,094	$14,135,242	-$1,897,148
2018	$12,191,248	$15,640,730	-$3,449,482
2019	$12,835,846	$16,108,123	-$3,272,277
Total	$61,570,429	$72,611,975	-$11,041,546

Eitz Chaim Schools has collective bargaining agreements with two labour groups, The Association of Hebrew School Educators, representing secular studies teachers and the Federation of Teachers in Hebrew Day Schools, representing Judaic studies staff. A secular studies staff member, teaching 30 hours per week, could receive an annual salary of up to $89,309.46, while a Judaic studies staff member could earn $94,255.50. These amounts are before any assigned recess duties or other additions to salary.

Approximately $5.26M is spent on teaching staff, with another $1.1M on principals, $1M on special education and $1M on administrative salaries. These figures are before calculations for additional costs of employment, such as CPP, EI, insurance benefits and pension, which amounts to approximately $1.23M. There is also $840K expensed towards the settlement of legal matters.

In recent years, Eitz Chaim Schools has made changes to its fundraising operations, running two crowdfunding campaigns that raised funds and presented an image to the community.

Data from Canada Revenue Agency
	Donations	Fundraising Expenses	Ratio	Net Income
2014	$1,660,905	$232,977	14%	$1,427,928
2015	$1,568,718	$44,580	3%	$1,524,138
2016	$1,144,916	$56,354	5%	$1,088,562
2017	$1,162,193	$429,311	37%	$732,882
2018	$1,869,060	$1,494,644	80%	$374,416
2019	$1,261,826	$1,293,294	103%	-$31,468

== Sex abuse ==
In 2018, Stephen Joseph Schacter, a teacher at Eitz Chaim Schools between 1986 and 2004 was found guilty of possessing child pornography, sexual assault, sexual interference, sexual exploitation and gross indecency related to students in the 1980s and early 2000s.

Rabbi Heshi Nussbaum was another Eitz Chaim teacher who pleaded guilty in the 1980s to child-abuse charges.

Significant settlement payments to various alumni who had been sexually abused in Eitz Chaim was one of the reasons the school had to sell Patricia campus in 2019.

== Notable alumni ==
- Rabbi Shmuel Kamenetzky
- Abie Rotenberg
- Baruch Levine
- Michael Seth Silverman
- Avrum Rosensweig
- Eli Rubenstein
- Zac Young

== Current Board Members ==
- Abe Gottesman (President)

Chaim Rutman

- Raphael Alter
- Josh Frankel
- John Kaplan
- Josh Kuhl
- Aitan Lerner
- Ira Marder
- Jonathan Rubin (Secretary)
- Oren Rosen
- Robert Silberstein
- Mark Spiro
- Naftali Sturm
