= Lay Down Your Arms (Doron Levinson song) =

"תפילה לשלום (Prayer for Peace)"

Song by Doron Levinson, Hamutal Ben Zeev-Efron
- Songwriters: Doron Levinson (music); The Bible (excerpts); Hamutal Ben Zeev-Efron (Hebrew lyrics)

"Lay Down Your Arms"

Song by Doron Levinson, Lisa-Catherine Cohen and Harry Lewis
- Songwriters: Doron Levinson (music); The Bible (excerpts); Lisa-Catherine Cohen and Harry Lewis (English lyrics)

"Lay Down Your Arms" is a peace song originally in Hebrew language as תפילה לשלום (i.e. "Prayer for Peace") composed by the Israeli Doron B. Levinson in 1973 in the aftermath of Yom Kippur War when Levinson was temporarily blind at the time, having been injured during the war. The Hebrew lyrics are by Hamutal Ben Zeev-Efron. The song is a tribute to a fallen Israeli soldier. The lyrics written by Hamutal Ben Zeev-Efron are inspired by the Isaiah (2:4) that says "And they shall beat their swords into ploughshares and their spears into pruning hooks; nation shall not lift up sword against nation, neither shall they teach their children war anymore".

At a later stage, the English lyrics were added, which are not direct translations, but whole new lyrics. They are written by Lisa-Catherine Cohen for the main text and by Harry Lewis, the latter contributing the bridge. Through Ms. Cohen in California, Hal Leonard/Cherry Lane Music, a large sheet music publishing company, acquired the sheet music rights, helping to distribute the song through its vast network.

"Lay Down Your Arms" has been performed by many children's and adult choirs, and audiences throughout Canada, the United States and Israel. It has been sung by congregations in synagogues and churches, as well as schools, camps and many social occasions. The song has been used in a number of films and features and has been broadcast on radio and television in Canada and the United States, and is a regular feature on Israel television's Yom Hazikaron broadcasts.

== Composition ==
Doron Levinson was commanding a tank battalion in the Israeli Army when one of his men confided in him his belief that this would be his last battle. Doron calmed the nervous soldier down, assuring him they would return from this encounter unscathed. But, Doron was wrong, and his soldier's premonition was accurate. In a fierce tank battle, his gunner was killed and Doron himself was temporarily blinded.

During his convalescence at an Israeli hospital, Doron, unable to see, found himself with time on his hands. On one of the hospital pianos, he found his fingers tracing out a melody expressing his anguish over his fallen comrade, and over other close friends he had lost in previous battles.

Levinson, a former soldier, graduated with a Ph.D. from the University of Toronto becoming an instructor of Hebrew and Jewish studies at Toronto's Temple Sinai Hebrew School. A multi-talented individual, musician and composer, a storyteller, he was convinced of the critical role music plays in the life of people, particularly children.

When he learned about the March of the Living, an international campaign to organize trips for Jewish children from around the world to visit Poland, and the former Nazi concentration camps there, and then to Israel, Doron met with Canadian March of the Living director, Eli Rubenstein. He asked him to consider including, in his March of the Living programming, the song Levinson had written, as a testament to all those dying in wars, and as a plea for peace and end to military conflict.

In 1990, Toronto's Habonim Youth Choir, founded by Esther Ghan Firestone and Eli Rubenstein, recorded the song in Hebrew with Firestone conducting the choir. Since many of the students did not understand the lyrics an English adaptation was deemed necessary. Rubenstein approached two songwriters, Lisa-Catherine Cohen and Harry Lewis to write an English adaptation, with Cohen writing the body of the lyrics, and Lewis contributing the bridge. The song was retitled "Lay Down Your Arms".

In 1992, a video of the song was produced.

== In popular culture ==
- Toronto's Habonim Youth Choir, conducted by Esther Ghan Firestone, the cantor of Toronto's Congregation Habonim, recorded the song in Hebrew. In 1992, a music video was released in addition to lyrics in English with some Hebrew verses. The choir was conducted by Esther Ghan Firestone and directed by Eli Rubenstein. The soloist in the video was 19-year-old Tara Strong (then Charendoff) who sang the part in the early 1990s when she was still attending high school in Toronto. The video was directed by Yehoram Pirotsky.
- Roots Canada launched a special promotion, producing a "Lay Down Your Arms" T-shirts and sweatshirts featuring a dove in the design. It also offered a free cassette of the song to each of its customers who purchased one.
- In the spring of 1995, several schools and religious institutions around the world commemorated the 50th anniversary of the liberation of Nazi death camps and the end of World War II with a performance of "Lay Down Your Arms".
- In 2000, it was performed by the 60-vocal choir of the University of Judaism in Los Angeles at the memorial for the children shot at California's Northridge Community Center.
- The Hebrew-language version was performed in a collective project with the participation of, amongst others, Ilanit, Harel Moyal, Leah Shabbat, Eli Luzon, Si Himan and Momi Levy, accompanied by the New Haifa Symphony Orchestra, the Li-Ron Herzeliya Children's Choir and the Hakol Zorem Choir. The arrangement was by Eldad Shrim, who also served as musical producer and conducted the New Haifa Symphony Orchestra for this project. The song and the music video were produced by Doron B. Levinson.
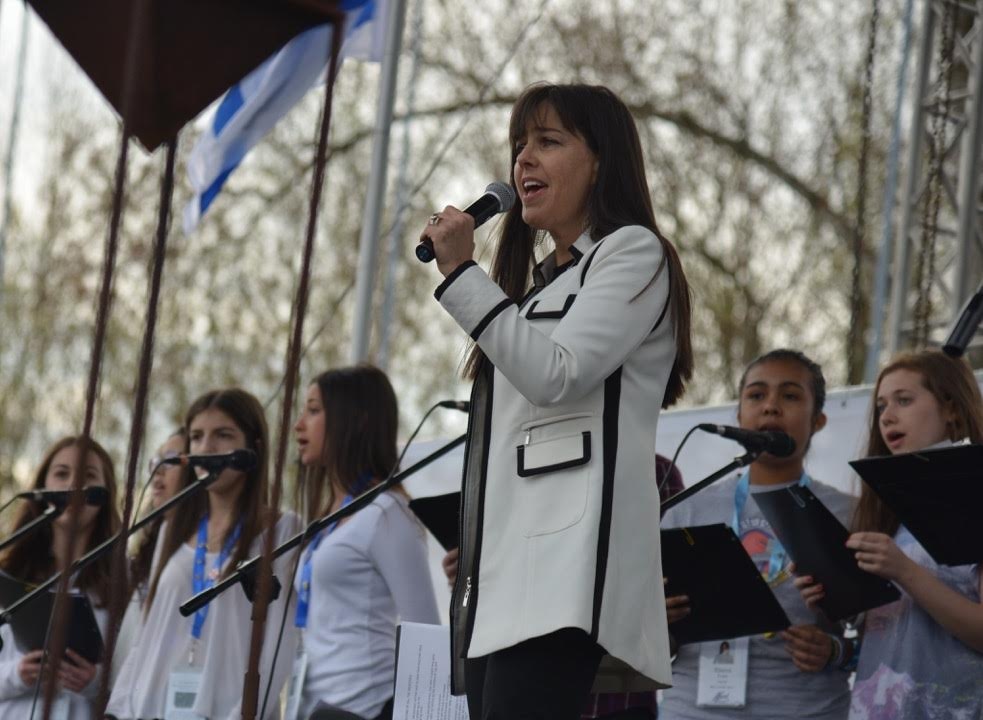
  Aviva Rajsky & March of the Living Choir 2015
- “Lay Down Your Arms” (2015 recording): To mark the 70th anniversary of the end of WWII in Europe, the March of the Living Children's Choir, joined by the Habonim Youth Choir, recorded a new version of “Lay Down Your Arms”. Cantor Aviva Rajsky and guitarist Tom Bellman - from Toronto's Congregation Habonim, who both accompanied the 2015 March of the Living - composed a new arrangement for the song. It was first performed on Holocaust Remembrance Day, at the 2015 March of the Living ceremony in Auschwitz-Birkenau.
- In November 2015, the more modern version of the song was released along with a music video. The new video and sheet music were sent to schools, with the suggestion they play the video during 2015 Remembrance Day commemorations and learn the song for future memorial events. The new music video included portions of the song performed in 2015 on Holocaust Remembrance Day at Auschwitz-Birkenau, at the Tempel Synagogue in Krakow and in Israel near Latrun, between Yom Hazikaron, which honours Israel's war dead, and Yom Ha’atzmaut, Israel's Independence Day. The Israel Museum gave permission to include images from the Dead Sea Scrolls, specifically the Great Isaiah Scroll. The oldest known version of the biblical book. “In the video you see lines written 2,200 to 2,300 years ago, on cracked parchment,” song and video producer Eli Rubenstein said. “It’s interesting to think that in 2015, with all sorts of modern technology, we’re reading something written in the hills of Judea 2,500 years ago. Look how powerful that message is. They remind us how far we have to go to build a world of peace.”
- The song was featured in "Gorbachev's Revolution" (2004), produced for History Channel's "Turning Points of History" to mark the 20th anniversary of Perestroika. The documentary includes interviews with former President Mikhail Gorbachev, George Bush Sr. and Eduard Shevardnadze.

== See also ==
- List of anti-war songs
