= Avrum Rosensweig =

Canadian Jewish community leader and broadcaster (born 1960)

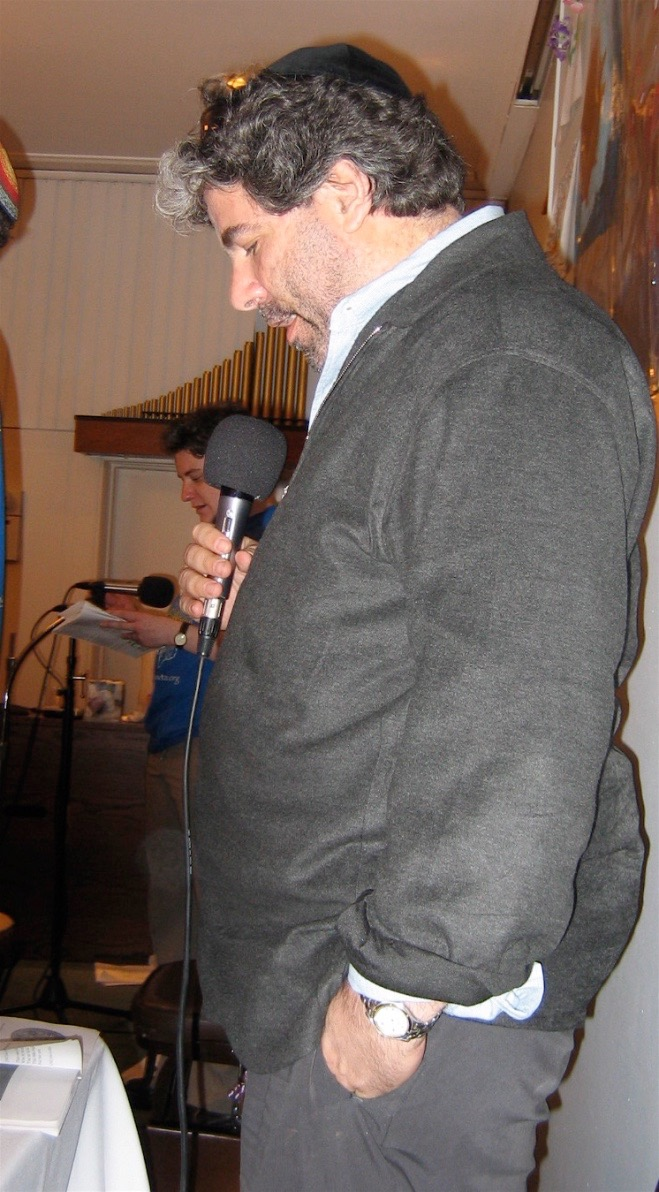
- Rosensweig leading a community Passover seder at Congregation Habonim in 2014
- Born: Avram Isaac Rosensweig; April 27, 1960 (age 66); Kitchener, Ontario, Canada
- Education: Ner Israel Yeshiva; Journalism studies
- Occupations: Community leader; humanitarian; broadcaster; writer; religious leader
- Years active: 1996–present
- Known for: Co-founder of Ve'ahavta; Marty & Avrum: The Food Guys; Marty & Avrum: The Moveable Feast
- Notable work: The Avrum Rosensweig Show
- Website: avrumrosensweig.com

Avrum Rosensweig (born April 27, 1960) is a Canadian Jewish community leader, broadcaster and writer. He co-founded the humanitarian organization Ve'ahavta in 1996 and served as its founding executive director and chief executive officer for twenty years. He has also worked as a religious leader, radio and television host, and newspaper columnist.

== Early life and education ==
Rosensweig was born Avram Isaac Rosensweig in Kitchener, Ontario, to Rabbi Phyvle (Philip) Rosensweig and Gitel Rosensweig (née Flicht). Members of his mother's family, who came from Wierzbnik, Poland, were murdered during the Holocaust.

He received an Orthodox Jewish education at Ner Israel Yeshiva in Toronto and later studied in Jerusalem. He subsequently studied journalism at Ryerson University.

== Ve'ahavta ==
Rosensweig and Stephen Epstein co-founded Ve'ahavta in 1996. The Toronto-based Jewish humanitarian organization takes its name from the Hebrew phrase meaning "and you shall love" and promotes the principle of tikkun olam, or repairing the world. Rosensweig served as its executive director and chief executive officer until 2016, when he moved into the position of founder and ambassador.

Under Rosensweig's leadership, Ve'ahavta organized international medical and disaster-relief missions and developed programs addressing homelessness and poverty in Toronto. Its medical teams worked in countries including Guyana and Zimbabwe and responded to natural disasters in Turkey, Sri Lanka, Haiti and Honduras. The organization also advocated greater awareness of the Darfur genocide.

Its Toronto initiatives included a mobile outreach van, educational and employment programs, a creative-writing contest for people experiencing homelessness, and the Ve'ahavta Street Academy.

Rosensweig recruited medical professionals for Ve'ahavta's first mission to Guyana in 1997. The organization brought donated medicines and established temporary clinics serving rural communities.

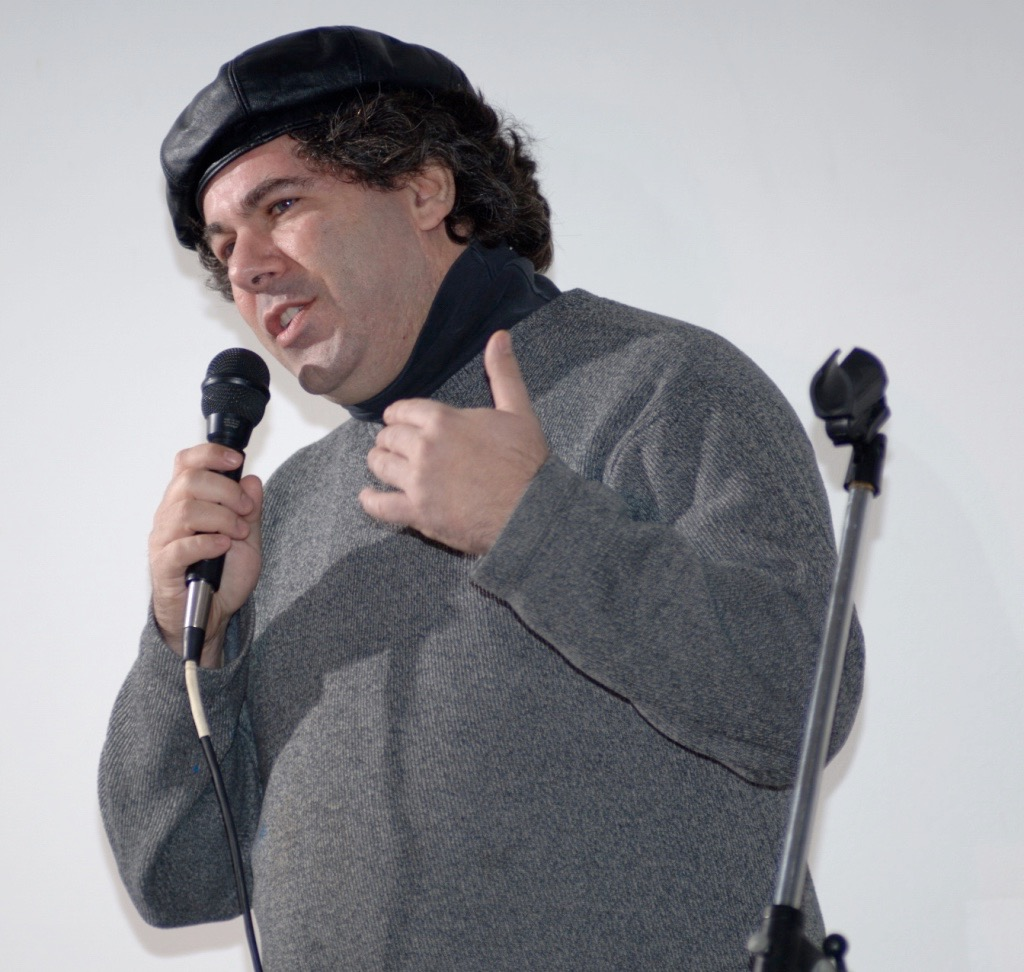
Rosensweig at a benefit following Hurricane Katrina

=== Ve'ahavta Street Academy ===
Rosensweig helped establish the Ve'ahavta Street Academy, which opened at George Brown College in 2011. The program was designed to provide education, personal support and employment preparation to people experiencing or at risk of homelessness.

The academy developed from an idea proposed by Theresa Schrader, a winner of Ve'ahavta's creative-writing contest. Schrader and Rosensweig worked with George Brown College to develop the program and recruit instructors.

== Religious and community work ==
Rosensweig served as associate religious leader at Congregation Habonim Toronto from 2005 to 2015.

He has also participated in initiatives involving Jewish and Indigenous communities. In 2015, CBC Radio interviewed him about Ve'ahavta's work with First Nations communities in Ontario. Historian David S. Koffman later discussed Rosensweig's work in an examination of Canadian Jewish engagement with Indigenous issues.

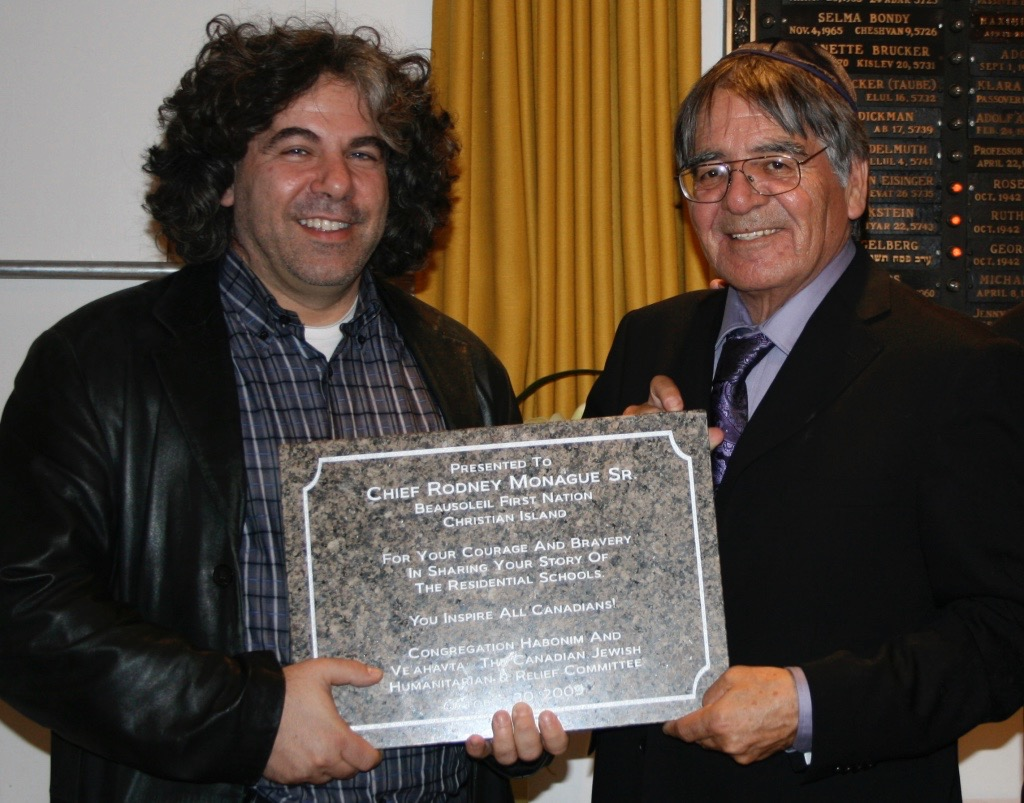
Rosensweig presenting a plaque to Chief Rodney Monague of Christian Island in 2009

== Writing ==
Rosensweig has contributed commentary to the National Post, HuffPost, Haaretz, The Canadian Jewish News and Congregation Habonim's bulletin. His writing has addressed antisemitism, Holocaust remembrance, Indigenous–Jewish relations and social isolation.

== Broadcasting ==
Rosensweig co-hosted a food and restaurant program with Marty Galin on Toronto radio. The pair began on Talk 640, where their program was initially known as the Marty & Avrum Restaurant Show.

In 1999, Galin and Rosensweig moved to CFRB, where they hosted a Saturday evening program, Marty & Avrum: The Food Guys that featured discussions about food and restaurants.

Galin and Rosensweig also hosted the television series Marty & Avrum: The Moveable Feast. Produced by Generator Films, the series followed them as they travelled across Canada in a motorhome and explored regional food and culture. Leader Media offered the series to international buyers at MIPTV in 2002.

== The Avrum Rosensweig Show ==
Rosensweig later launched The Avrum Rosensweig Show, an online interview podcast dealing with personal experiences, Jewish community affairs, Holocaust remembrance and Israel. Episodes have featured guests including Holocaust educator Eli Rubenstein, survivor Nate Leipciger, musician David Broza, Canadian ambassador to the United Nations Bob Rae and Rabbi Dr. Natan Slifkin, widely known as the "Zoo Rabbi," who is a British-born Israeli Orthodox rabbi, author, and the founder and director of The Biblical Museum of Natural History in Beit Shemesh, Israel.
