= Congregation Habonim Toronto =

Liberal reform synagogue in Toronto, Ontario, Canada

Congregation Habonim of Toronto
- Location in Toronto

Religion
- Affiliation: Judaism
- Rite: Unaffiliated
- Ecclesiastical or organisational status: Synagogue
- Status: Active

Location
- Location: Toronto, Ontario, Canada
- Municipality: Toronto
- Coordinates: 43°42′46″N 79°25′46″W

Architecture
- Type: Synagogue
- Completed: 1954

Website
- www.congregationhabonim.org

Congregation Habonim Toronto, founded in 1953, is a liberal reform synagogue located at 5 Glen Park Avenue in Toronto, Ontario, Canada, and one of the first Holocaust refugee/survivor congregations to develop in Canada. Although currently independent of any official denomination, its early founders modeled the synagogue on the example of early Reform Judaism in Germany.

== History ==
The early members of Habonim (literally "the builders") were Holocaust survivors or refugees from Central Europe, who arrived in Canada after World War II.

One of its founders and first President was George Spitz, a Jewish refugee from Berlin, who unsuccessfully attempted to bring over his family from Germany in 1939 on the ill-fated MS St. Louis.

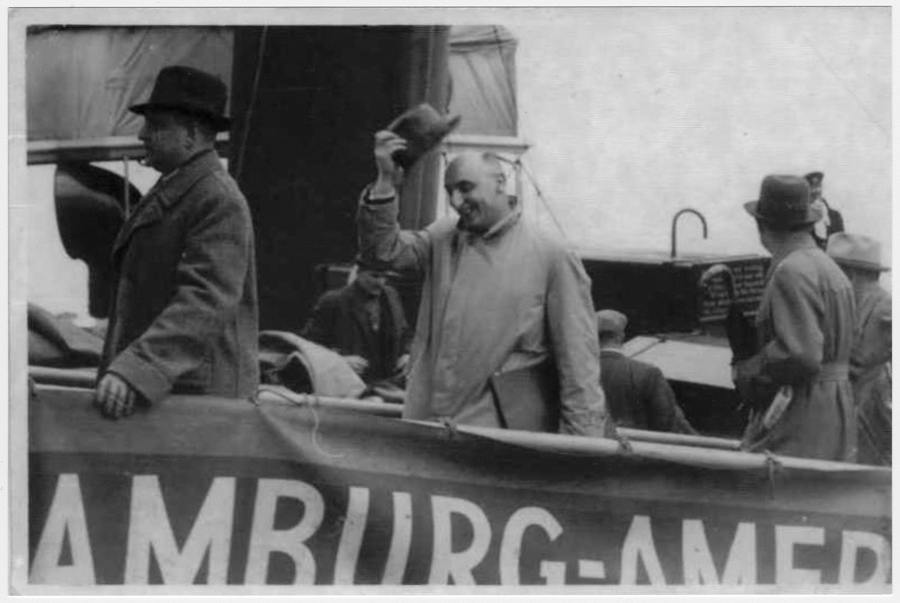
George Spitz (center) boards a ship for Cuba to set up a home for his family, two weeks prior to the departure of the St. Louis.

Paul Alexander, also a refugee of Berlin, was an early vice-president of the synagogue – his twin brother Hanns was most famous for capturing Rudolf Höss, the Kommandant of Auschwitz. Both served as officers in the British Army during World War II and, given their fluency with the German language, were in charge of German POWs at the war's close.

The first High Holiday services were held in 1954 in rented premises downtown, but by 1958 they were renting space from the Judaea Lodge of the Knights of Pythias, a non-sectarian branch of an American organization started during the U.S. Civil War and established in Toronto 1927. This rented space in uptown Toronto was located at its current site near Bathurst and Glencairn. The building was purchased outright by the Congregation in 1968.

== The Habonim Youth Choir ==
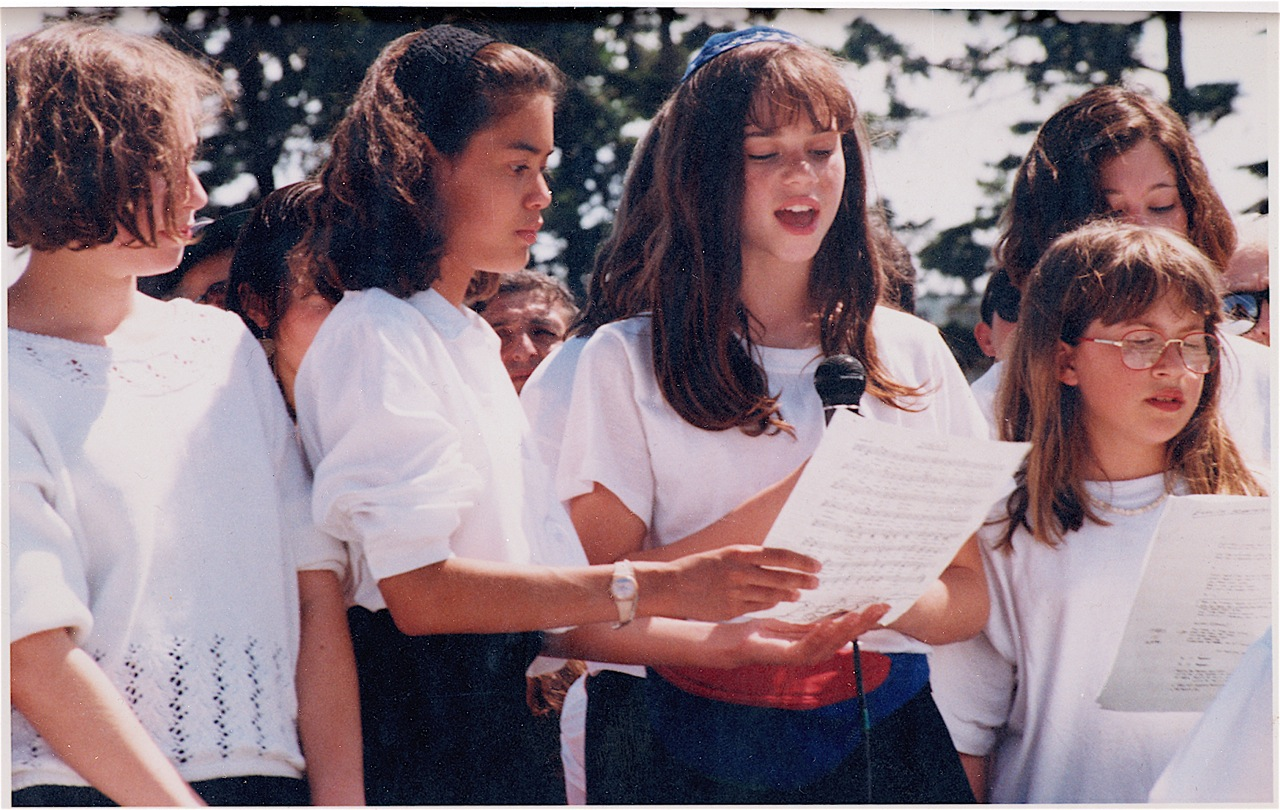
Habonim Youth Choir performs at Yad Vashem Holocaust Memorial in Toronto

The Congregation also supports a choir, the Habonim Youth Choir, whose recording of the peace song Lay Down Your Arms (Doron Levinson song) has received international exposure. The choir was founded in 1990 by Habonim's cantor Esther Ghan Firestone and the synagogue's religious leader Eli Rubenstein. The choir's current conductor is Habonim cantor Aviva Rajsky, and its accompanist is Tom Bellman. The choir, which presently also includes adults, is now called, "The Habonim Choir."

The choir's rendition of Lay Down Your Arms was featured on Fern Levitt's documentary, Gorbachev's Revolution.

Their recording of the Holocaust song, Eli, Eli (lyrics by Hannah Szenes), and "The Song of the Vilna Partisans" (Zog Nit Keyn Mol) appeared on David Kaufman's 2003 documentary, From Despair to Defiance, commemorating the 60th anniversary of the Warsaw Ghetto Uprising. Eli, Eli also appeared on the short documentary "To Live and Die with Honor" commemorating the 70th anniversary of the Warsaw Ghetto Uprising. On May 22, 2014, the Habonim Youth Choir opened up for the legendary Puerto Rican virtuoso blind guitarist & singer, Jose Feliciano, at a Benefit Concert for the Canadian Friends of the Israel Guide Dog Centre for the Blind at the Toronto Centre for the Arts.

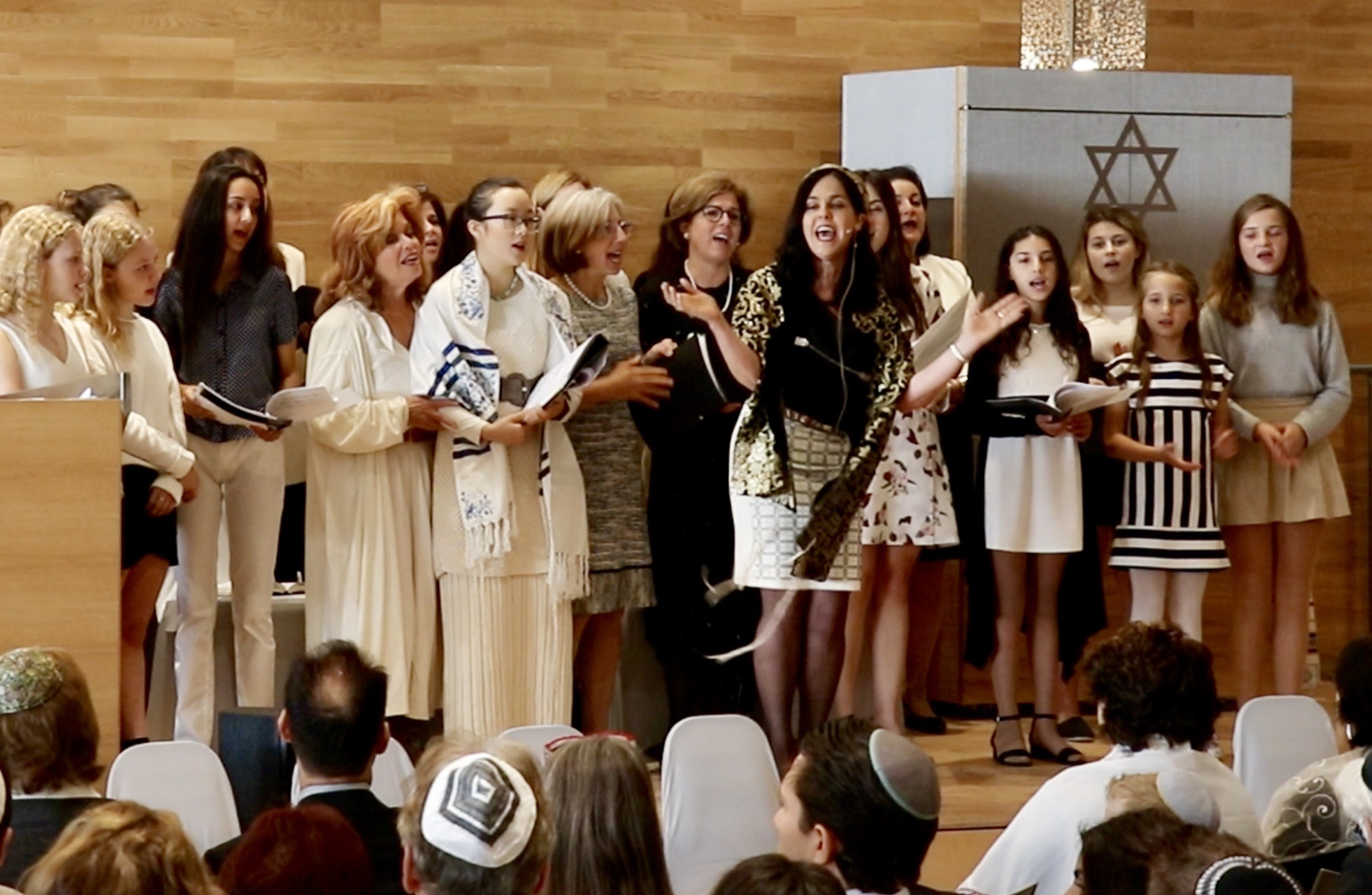
Aviva Rajsky leading the Habonim Choir during High Holiday services. (Photo: Eli Rubenstein)

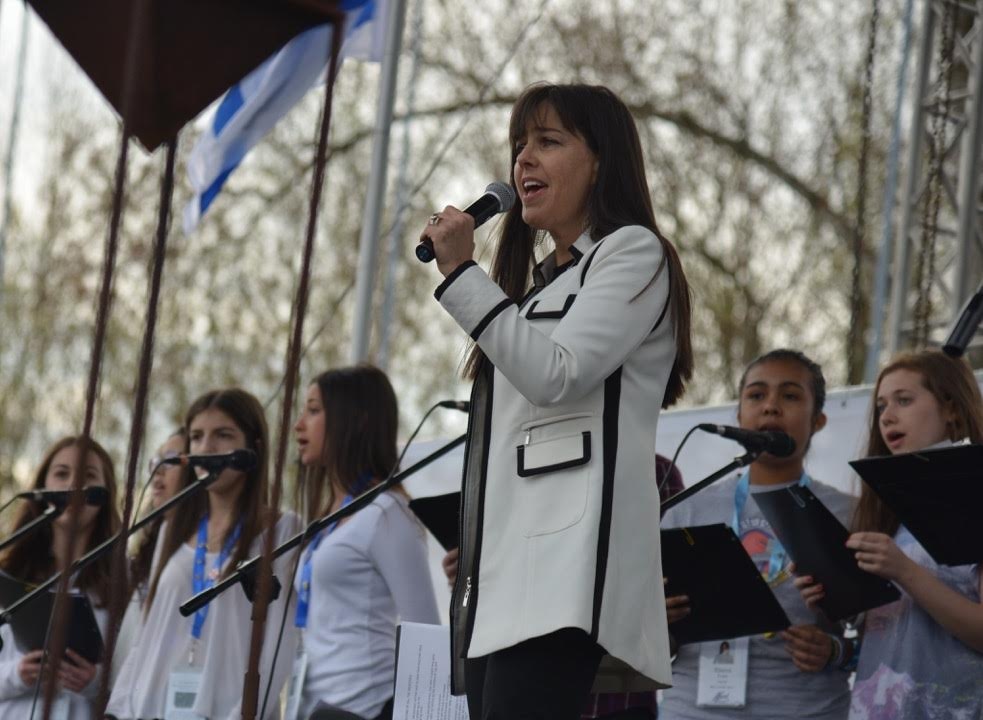
Aviva Rajsky & March of the Living Choir 2015

2015 Recording of "Lay Down Your Arms":

To mark the 70th anniversary of the end of World War II in Europe, the Habonim Youth Choir and the March of the Living Children's Choir, recorded a new version of "Lay Down Your Arms". Cantor Aviva Rajsky and guitarist Tom Bellman – from Toronto's Congregation Habonim – composed a new arrangement for the song. It was first performed on Holocaust Remembrance Day, at the 2015 March of the Living ceremony in Auschwitz-Birkenau.

== Partnership with other organizations ==
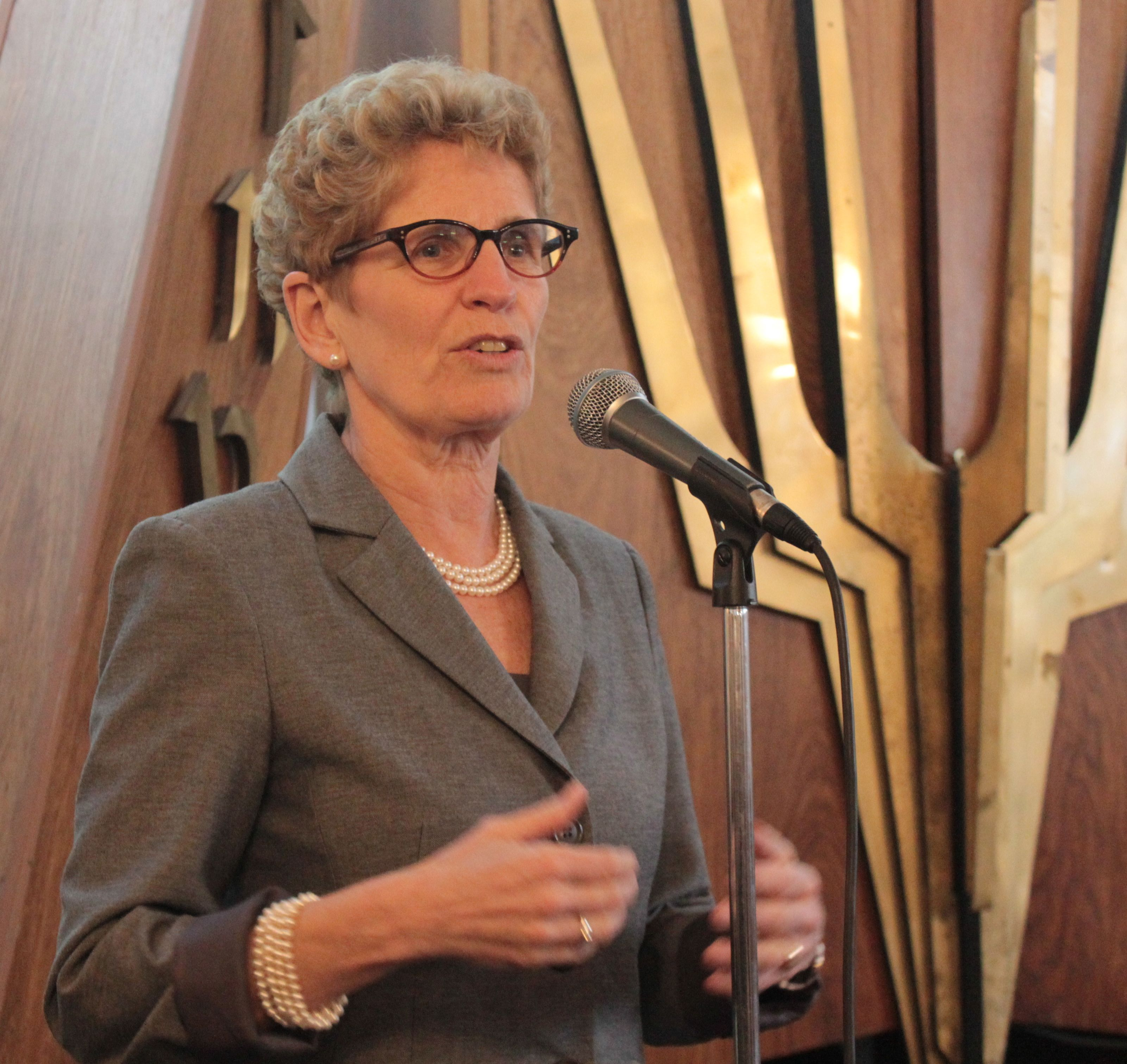
Ontario premier Kathleen Wynne speaks at Congregation Habonim Toronto at Passover seder.

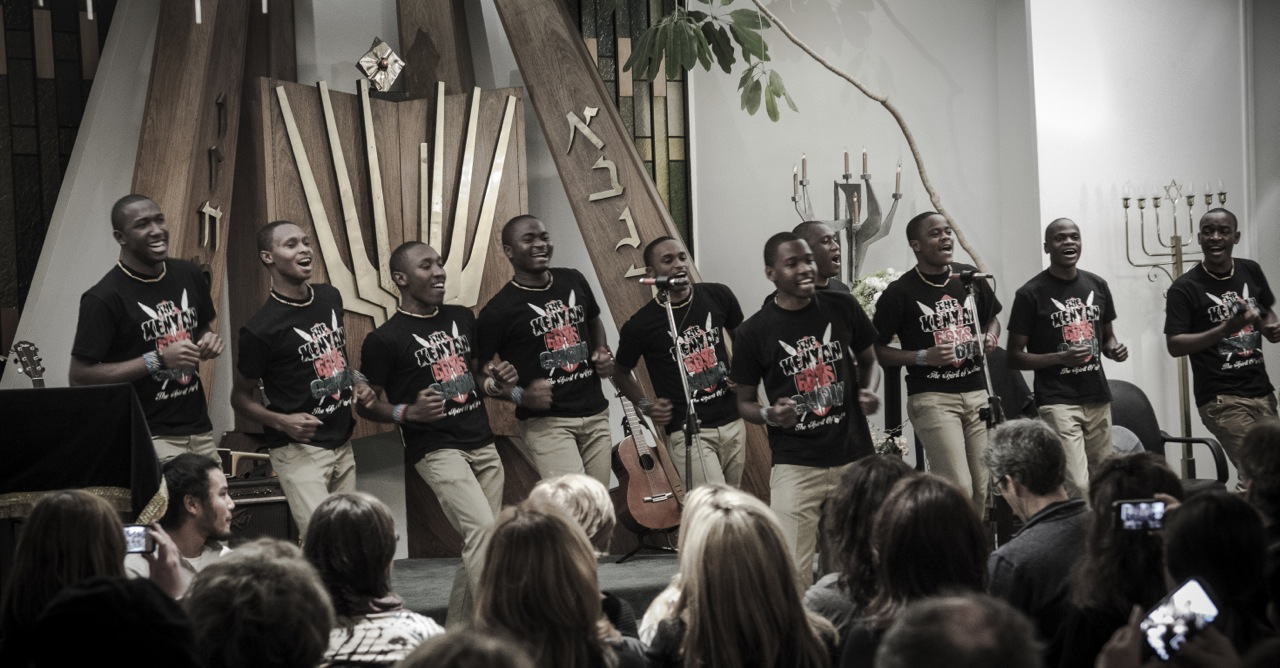
Kenyan Boys Choir performing at Congregation Habonim

The synagogue makes its facilities available to a number of other organizations, including Ve'ahavta, co-sponsoring a Passover Seder for the Homeless every year and the Toronto Partnership Minyan, an Orthodox egalitarian initiative in Toronto spearheaded by Professor Martin Lockshin, and has co-sponsored events with other organizations outside the Jewish community such as Free the Children and Me to We, producing a joint event featuring the Kenyan Boys Choir.

It is also home to Canada's only multi-denominational introductory conversion course.

== Synagogue interior ==
The synagogue windows are made of stained glass created by modern-day master Gerald Tooke (1931–2011), considered among Canada's leading practitioners of the craft. His work may also be seen at Mount Allison University Chapel in Sackville, N.B, Ontario's legislative buildings in Toronto, and in many churches and other buildings across Canada, said to number around 100 in all.

The distinctive ark was designed by celebrated Canadian sculptor May Marx. The ark was manufactured and installed by longtime synagogue member Alfred Altman, himself a refugee from Düsseldorf Germany. While he escaped Düsseldorf on the Kindertransport in 1939, both his parents were murdered in the Holocaust and now have Stolperstein monuments placed in their memory in front of their former home.

== New building ==
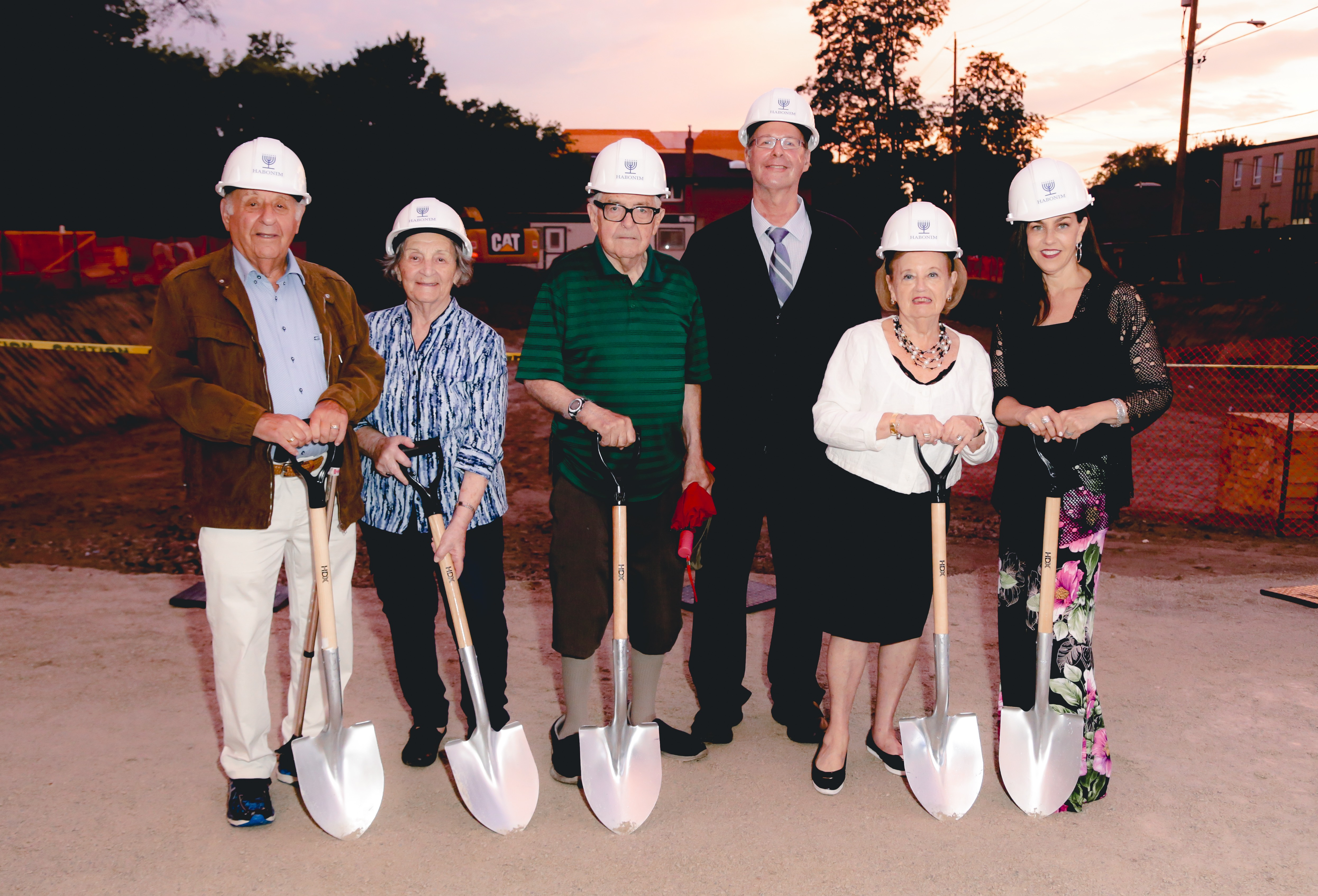
Participating in Groundbreaking, Habonim members & Holocaust survivors (left to right), Harry Rozendaal, Erika Erdos, Art Linder and Felicia Cukier, along with Habonim Religious Leader, Eli Rubenstein (Third from Right) and Cantor Aviva Rajsky (Far Right). July 16, 2018

In 2015, amidst a growing membership and religious school the synagogue launched a new building campaign to replace its decaying structure, aimed at raising $9.5 million, later revised to $13.5 million. As of early 2018, $12 million of its fundraising goal had been reached. Groundbreaking took place in the summer of 2018, with completion taking place in the fall of 2019 in time for the 2019 High Holidays.

“I feel a great sense of pride that I have been able to be even a small part of the process that is leading Habonim into a new era. I love the clean simplicity of the design. I feel we have been able to maintain the humble beginnings of our congregation in a beautiful new building that speaks to the future.,’" Habonim President Joanie Smith said in an interview with the Canadian Jewish News in November 2019.

== Notable figures ==
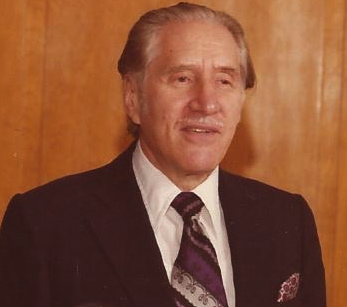
Toronto rabbi Reuben Slonim who served at Congregation Habonim for 23 years, from 1960 to 1983

Some of the notable figures associated with the Congregation include:

- Esther Ghan Firestone, the first female cantor in Canada
- Paul Godfrey, businessman and former politician.
- Paul Hoffert, musician and author.
- Rabbi Reuben Slonim (1914–2000) (author, and also associate editor of The Toronto Telegram), known for his outspoken views on the Israeli-Arab conflict
- Larry Tanenbaum, businessman and board member of Maple Leaf Sports & Entertainment.
- Kathleen Taylor, chancellor of York University and former Royal Bank of Canada chair.
- Cantor Henry Weingluck, a well known artist who was a pupil of Max Liebermann.
- Avrum Rosensweig, founder of Ve'ahavta, the Canadian Jewish Humanitarian Relief Organization. Rosensweig served as associate Religious Leader from 2005 to 2015.
- Eli Rubenstein, the Congregation's religious leader since 1988, a writer, filmmaker, and leader of the Canadian March of the Living and March of Remembrance and Hope programs
- Bernard Zinman, diabetes researcher.
