= Bernard Zinman =

Canadian endocrinologist

Bernard Zinman is a Canadian clinical and research endocrinologist, whose research at the University of Toronto focuses on type 1 and type 2 diabetes. He directed the Mount Sinai Hospital Leadership Sinai Centre for Diabetes and the Banting and Best Diabetes Centre (university of Toronto). In 2019, he was appointed as an Officer to the Order of Canada in recognition of his scientific contributions, including the development of preventative therapies for diabetes.

He has published over 400 articles and has been cited 134,000+ times. https://scholar.google.com/citations?user=z5PDrpoAAAAJ&hl=en

== Early life and education ==
Zinman was born in Montreal. He completed his medical degree at McGill University, with further training in internal medicine and endocrinology at McGill University and the University of Toronto.

== Career ==
Zinman joined Mount Sinai Hospital in 1990. His research has focused on the treatment of diabetes. He directed the Banting and Best Diabetes Centre at the University of Toronto from 1993 to 2000. During this time Zinman worked with Robert Hegele and Stewart Harris to identify the first diabetes-risk gene in an aboriginal population.

In 2000 Zinman became Director of the Leadership Sinai Centre for Diabetes, an Ontario diabetes research clinic and Zinman is currently a professor of medicine at the University of Toronto and a Senior Scientist at Mount Sinai's Lunenfeld-Tanenbaum Research Institute.

Zinman was one of three Canadian principal investigators leading the U.S.-Canada Diabetes Control and Complications Trial (DCCT), which was launched in 1982 across 29 hospitals and universities; this large type 1 diabetes complications study set out to determine whether intensive or conventional treatment was more effective in tackling diabetic complications. The DCCT provided evidence showing that maintaining blood glucose levels close to normal slows the onset and progression of diabetic complications, such as those found in the eye, kidneys, and nervous system. Later on, in a long-term clinical trial consisting of over 7,000 adults in 42 countries with type 2 diabetes, Zinman demonstrated that empagliflozin treatment reduced the risk of death caused by cardiovascular disease by 38 percent.

Zinman is a Judy Pencer Family Chair in Diabetes Research, and was appointed as an Officer to the Order of Canada in 2019. He was the 2020 recipient of the American Diabetes Association's Outstanding Achievement in Clinical Diabetes Research Award. Zinman is also one of the Sinai 100 Chairs, funded by the Sinai Health Foundation.

== Personal life ==
Zinman is married, and has three children and four grandchildren.

== Selected bibliography ==
- Zinman, B., Wanner, C., Lachin, J. M., Fitchett, D., Bluhmki, E., Hantel, S., ... & Broedl, U. C. (2015). Empagliflozin, cardiovascular outcomes, and mortality in type 2 diabetes. The New England Journal of Medicine, 373(22), 2117–2128.
- Nathan, D. M., Buse, J. B., Davidson, M. B., Ferrannini, E., Holman, R. R., Sherwin, R., & Zinman, B. (2009). Medical management of hyperglycemia in type 2 diabetes: a consensus algorithm for the initiation and adjustment of therapy: a consensus statement of the American Diabetes Association and the European Association for the Study of Diabetes. Diabetes Care, 32(1), 193–203.
- Gerstein, H. C., Mann, J. F., Yi, Q., Zinman, B., Dinneen, S. F., Hoogwerf, B., ... & Nawaz, S. (2001). Albuminuria and risk of cardiovascular events, death, and heart failure in diabetic and nondiabetic individuals. JAMA, 286(4), 421–426.
- Nathan, D. M., Buse, J. B., Davidson, M. B., Heine, R. J., Holman, R. R., Sherwin, R., & Zinman, B. (2006). Management of hyperglycemia in type 2 diabetes: a consensus algorithm for the initiation and adjustment of therapy: a consensus statement from the American Diabetes Association and the European Association for the Study of Diabetes. Diabetes Care, 29(8), 1963–1972.

== See also ==
- List of companions of the Order of Canada
