= Reuben Slonim =

Canadian rabbi and journalist (b. 1914, d. 2000)

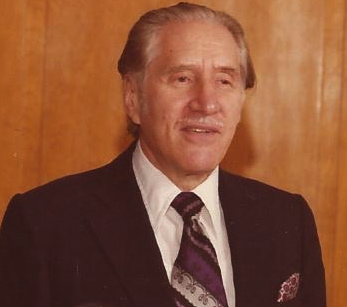
Image of Reuben Slonim

Reuben Slonim (1914–January 20, 2000) was a Canadian rabbi and journalist.

== Early life ==
Slonim was born in Winnipeg, Manitoba. After his immigrant father suffered a stroke, his mother cared for her husband and three children. The family resided at the Jewish Orphanage and Children's Aid of Western Canada, where his mother worked as a cook. In his memoir Grand to Be an Orphan, Slonim wrote that the orphanage provided educational opportunities and also described instances of physical abuse by staff.

== Education ==
With support from the orphanage, Slonim studied at a yeshiva in Chicago and attended the Illinois Institute of Technology, where he earned a B.S.A.S. degree in 1933. He subsequently studied at the Jewish Theological Seminary, where he was ordained and received a Master of Hebrew Literature (M.H.L.) in 1937. Between 1935 and 1937, he also attended Albany Law School in New York.

== Community activism ==
Slonim held several community positions, including serving as president of the Toronto Zionist Council from 1947 to 1952 and as chair of the Synagogue Council State of Israel Bonds from 1955 to 1960. Later in his career, he expressed opposition to the policies of the State of Israel and criticized what he viewed as uncritical support for Israel within the Jewish community.

== Journalism ==
In 1955, Slonim was hired by the Toronto Telegram as associate editor specializing in Middle East affairs. He remained with the newspaper until it ceased publication in 1971 and later contributed to the Jewish Standard. In his writings, Slonim frequently criticized the role of Orthodox Jewish influence in Israeli politics and Israel's treatment of Palestinians. He also advocated for Israeli withdrawal from the occupied Palestinian territories and opposed the 1982 Lebanon War.

== Rabbi ==
In 1937, Slonim became rabbi of Toronto's McCaul Street Synagogue, becoming one of the first Canadian-born rabbis to lead a Masorti congregation. He served there for three years before holding rabbinical positions in Cleveland and Troy, New York, over the following seven years. In 1947, he returned to Toronto to serve again at the McCaul Street Synagogue until its 1955 merger with the University Avenue Synagogue. He was not appointed to a senior role in the newly formed Beth Tzedec Congregation.

In 1960, Slonim became rabbi of Congregation Habonim Toronto, a small unaffiliated liberal congregation founded by Central European Holocaust survivors and influenced by German liberal Judaism. He attracted a younger, Canadian-born membership, and during his tenure, he publicly criticized Israeli government policies, which drew opposition from some Zionists. Following the 1982 Lebanon War, he was fired from his position. He later recounted his rabbinical experiences in his 1987 book To Kill a Rabbi.

Slonim went on to co-found the Association for the Living Jewish Spirit, which held High Holiday services until 1999.

== Later life ==
Toward the end of his life, Slonim received formal recognition from the Jewish community. Rabbi Gunther Plaut, who had previously disagreed with Slonim on various issues, later acknowledged that Slonim had been unjustly marginalized and expressed regret for his role in that treatment. In 1998, the Jewish Theological Seminary honored Slonim for his years of service. He died on January 20, 2000, at the age of 85, at his home, following a stroke and complications related to Alzheimer's disease. According to his daughter, Rena Tsur, he had been in poor health during the preceding year. His wife, Reta, had died six years earlier.

== Other writing ==
In addition to his two memoirs, Slonim published In the Steps of Pope Paul (1965), an account of Pope Paul's visit to the Middle East; Both Sides Now (1972) summarizing his career at the Toronto Telegram, and Family Quarrel: The United Church and the Jews (1977) chronicling disputes over Israel between Zionists and the United Church of Canada.
