= Congregation Habonim =

Synagogue in Manhattan, New York

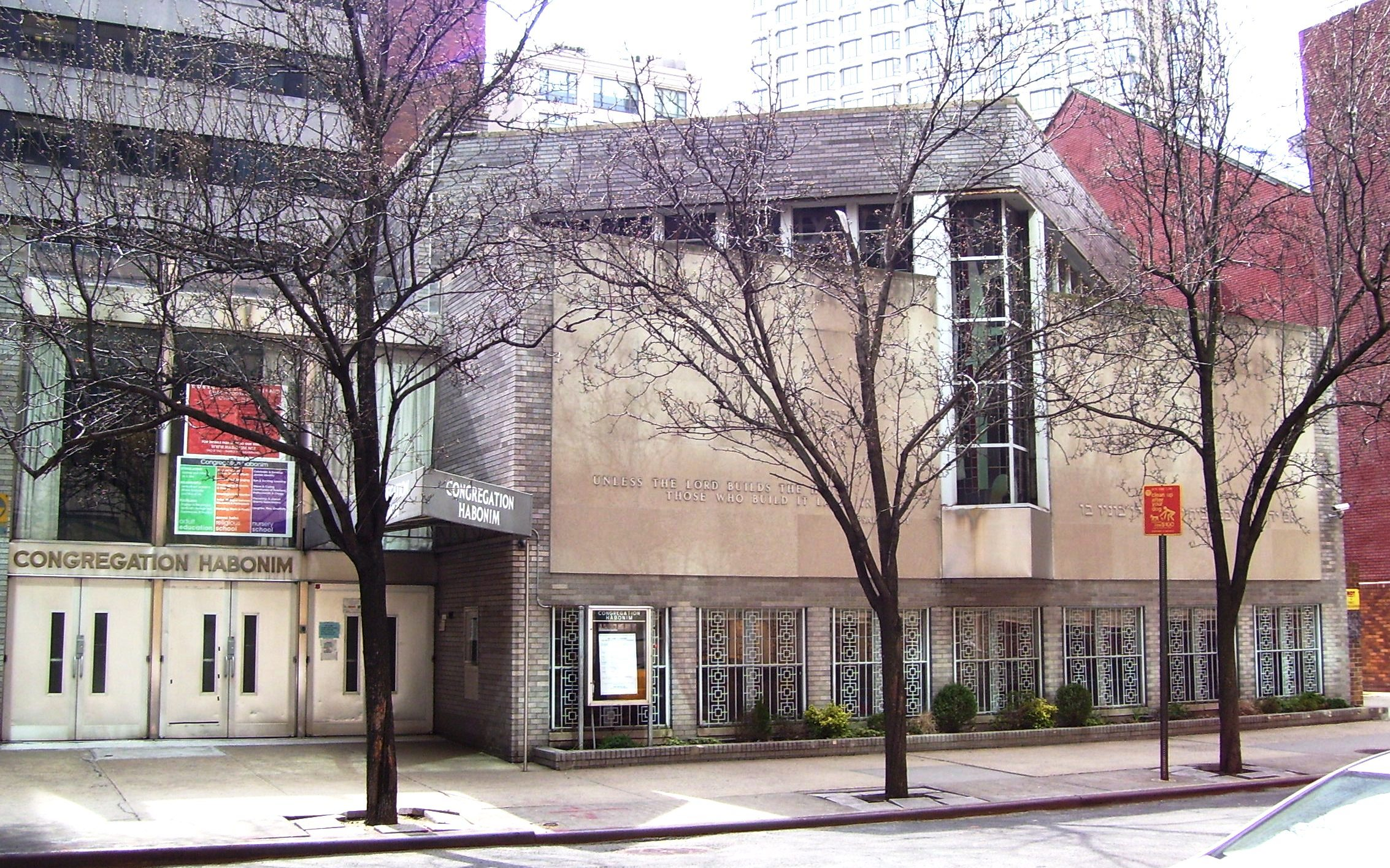
- Congregation Habonim in Manhattan

- Location in Upper West Side in Manhattan

Religion
- Affiliation: Conservative Judaism
- Ecclesiastical or organisational status: Synagogue
- Leadership: Rabbi Lisa Gelber
- Status: Active

Location
- Location: 103 West End Avenue (cnr W. 64th Street), Upper West Side, Manhattan, New York City, New York 10023
- Country: United States
- Coordinates: 40°46′22″N 73°58′49″W

Architecture
- Founder: Rabbi Hugo Hahn; Bernard Cohn
- Established: November 1939 (as a congregation)
- Completed: 1958

Website
- habonim.net

The Congregation Habonim is a Conservative synagogue located at 103 West End Avenue on the Upper West Side of Manhattan, New York City. The congregation was founded in 1939 by German-Jewish immigrants who fled Nazi persecution. The founding rabbi was Hugo Hahn and his son-in-law Bernard Cohn. The congregation’s first building, on West 66th Street in Manhattan, was completed in 1958. The building was demolished in 2017 to make way for the development of an apartment building that would also house the congregation's synagogue upon completion.
