= Eli Rubenstein =

Holocaust educator, writer, filmmaker, and storyteller

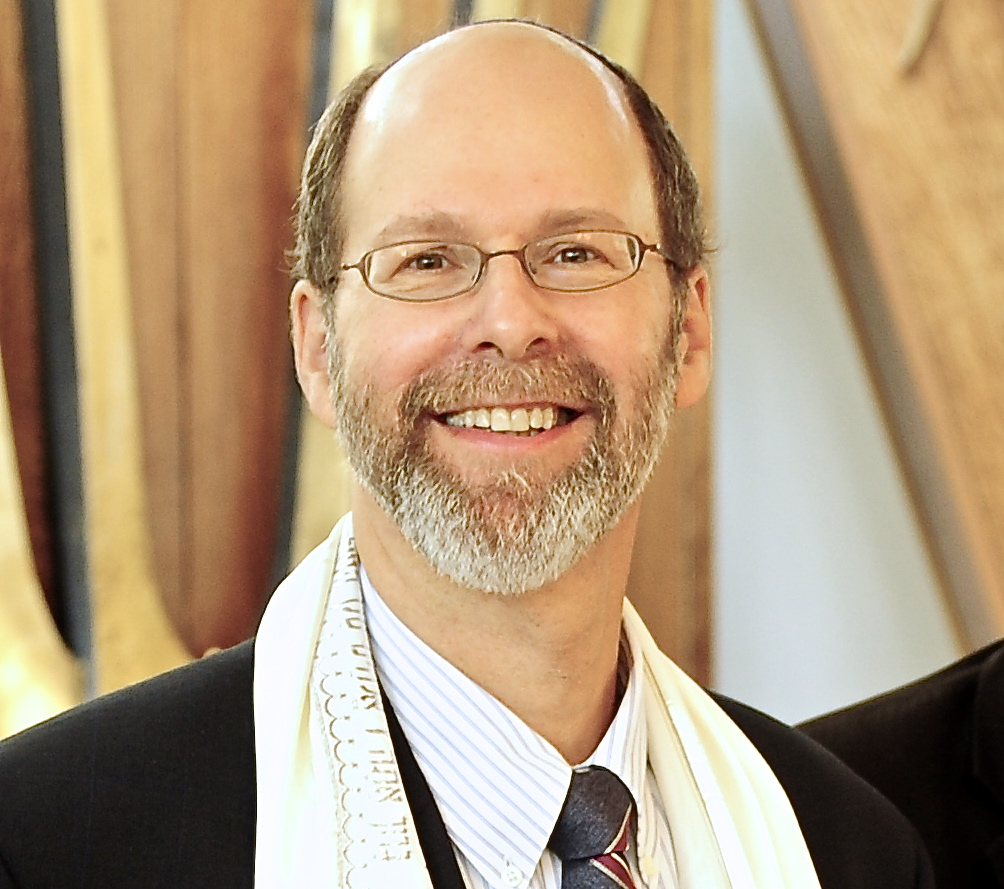
Eli Rubenstein at Congregation Habonim

Eli Rubenstein OC (born in 1959) is a Holocaust educator, writer, storyteller, filmmaker, activist, and rabbi. He has been the religious leader of Congregation Habonim Toronto, a Toronto synagogue founded by Holocaust survivors, since 1988. He also Director of Education for International March of the Living. Rubenstein served as National Director of March of the Living Canada from 1988 to 2024. Rubenstein was the President of the Israel Guide Dog Centre for the Blind, and was appointed to the Order of Canada in December 2022. On May 7th, 2026, Rubenstein was ordained in honour of nearly four decades of leadership at his synagogue, Congregation Habonim Toronto.

== Background ==
Rubenstein was raised in Toronto's orthodox Jewish community by parents of Hungarian and Polish Jewish lineage. He attended Eitz Chaim School as a child. His mother, Esther Rubenstein née Greenblatt, was a Holocaust refugee from Szatmárcseke, Hungary, who escaped to the United States in the spring of 1941 at age eight on one of the last trains permitted to leave Hungary. His great-grandmother, Amalia Malka Greenblatt (1860-1945), was deported to Auschwitz from Debrecen, Hungary, in 1944 but ended up at a forced labour camp in Austria due to the bombing of the Auschwitz train tracks. She survived the war and was carried back to Debrecen by family members but died on July 6, 1945.

Rubenstein's father, Isadore Israel Rubenstein, was born in Toronto, Canada. His grandfather, Nechemia Charles Rubenstein, emigrated to Canada from Tarlow, Poland, in 1913. Nazi Germany destroyed the Jewish community of Tarlow, Poland, in the Holocaust, a subject Rubenstein addressed in a sermon he delivered to his congregation following his visit to Tarlow in 2011.

Rubenstein's first cousin is Jason Greenblatt, the former chief legal officer of the Trump Organization and former President Donald Trump's special representative for international negotiations. Holocaust survivor and anti war activist Robert Greenblatt is Rubenstein's first cousin, once removed.

== Congregation Habonim ==
Rubenstein has served as the religious leader of Congregation Habonim Toronto since 1988, succeeding Rabbi Allen Veaner, who followed Rabbi Reuben Slonim.

He has helped facilitate collaborative initiatives with numerous organizations, such as Ve'ahavta (for their annual Passover Seder for the Homeless), Sara and Chaim Neuberger Holocaust Education Centre, Free the Children, the Polish Consulate, the Toronto Partnership Minyan, and various other organizations.

In 2015, amidst a growing membership and religious school, Rubenstein, together with Rabbi Cantor Aviva Rajsky, led the synagogue in a new building campaign to replace its decaying structure, which eventually raised the needed funds. Groundbreaking took place in the summer of 2018, and the new building was opened in the fall of 2019.

A member of Congregation Habonim, Canadian actor, musician, and producer Shaina Silver-Baird credits the original idea for her comedy web series "Less Than Kosher" to her earlier days out of theatre school, recruited by Rubenstein as a substitute cantor for weddings and children's services at the synagogue. Congregation Habonim has archived some of Rubenstein's sermons online.

== Storytelling ==
Rubenstein is an avid storyteller and speaker and has done so across Canada, the United States, Europe, Israel, and Africa. He was a co-organizer of "Because God Loves Stories," an annual storytelling event in memory of mentor, Alec Gelcer. The concert was part of The Annual Toronto Festival of Storytelling. An article in CJN with Rubenstein interviewed reads, "Under [Alec] Gelcer's influence, he introduced stories into his sermons. He noticed that sermons on theology sometimes had his congregation squirming in their seats. “But as soon as I launched into a story, people were sitting on the edge of their seats.” One article quoted, "Eli brings his guitar, a wealth of stories and folk-tales, and a relaxed and joyful approach to services and programs at Habonim."

Rubenstein has been the keynote speaker for Holocaust Education Week in Toronto. Speaking about storytelling in 2011, he said, “When you hear a story you become part of the story. You place yourself in the shoes of the person in the story and you develop, probably the most important human quality, which is empathy. If you have empathy, that is the key to making the world a better place.”

In Rubenstein's book,Witness: Passing the Torch of Holocaust Memory to New Generations, on the subject of the significance of storytelling and passing stories on, former president Obama said:

"I think of Pinchas Gutter, a man who lived through the Warsaw Ghetto Uprising, and survived the Majdanek death camp…‘I tell my story,’ he says, ‘for the purpose of improving humanity, drop by drop by drop. Like a drop of water falls on a stone and erodes it, so, hopefully, by telling my story over and over again, I will achieve the purpose of making the world a better place to live in.’ Those are the words of one survivor – performing that sacred duty of memory."

== March of the Living ==
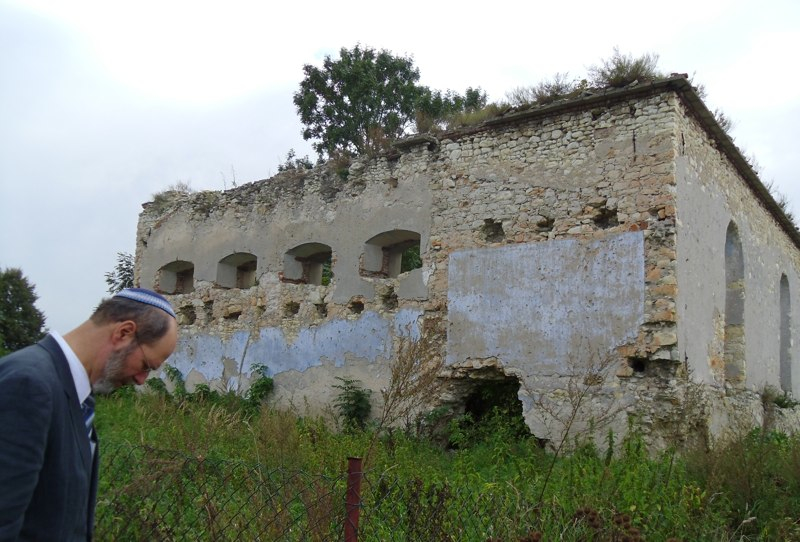
Tarlow Synagogue Ruins- Eli Rubenstein-Sep. 14, 2011 - SAM 0055

Rubenstein has been involved with March of the Living since its inception in Canada in 1988. It is an annual educational program that brings together thousands of youths in Poland and Israel to mark Holocaust Remembrance Day and Israel's Independence Day. He assumed the role of National Director in 1989 and led his first Canadian delegation on the March in 1990, where he first met Elie Wiesel, whom he has prominently featured in his published works.

In 2017, Elisha Wiesel was invited by Rubenstein to attend the March of the Living to light a torch in memory of his father, Elie Wiesel, where he delivered a speech to many thousands of participants. "It is a reminder to all of us that we are the next generation. We must all pick up the torch," Rubenstein commented.

Over the years, Toronto has brought the largest delegation for the March of the Living, and Canada is among the countries with the largest delegation.

In 2019, Rubenstein led an effort to bring together the USC Shoah Foundation and the International March of the Living. The joint project involved capturing the testimonies of Holocaust survivors in Europe, using 360-degree filming techniques at the locations where they experienced life before and during the war and where they were liberated. This project aims to ensure that those participating in the March of the Living in Poland can benefit from the survivors' stories relevant to the places they visit.

Commenting on this project, Rubenstein added that "by using emerging technologies, the project is transforming the way the stories and lessons of the Holocaust are learned by people around the globe".

In one of Rubenstein's sermons titled, "Rescuing the Memory of the Six Million: One by One by One," he wrote about the 2021 Virtual March of the Living (during the COVID-19 pandemic, the in-person March was cancelled that year). The March of the Living commemorated Yom Hashoah with a special online program on the theme of "Medicine and Morality: Lessons from the Holocaust and COVID-19."

During the memorial program, a candle lighting ceremony was performed honoring the medical professionals who opposed the Nazis in the Holocaust. A candle was also lit in memory of the victims of COVID-19. One of the six candles was lit in honor of Dr. Benedykt Ziemilski – one of the six million victims of the Holocaust. It was lit by Dr. Allen Nager, Director, Division of 1 Emergency and Transport Medicine and Professor of Clinical Pediatrics at the Keck School of Medicine of USC.

=== Building Bridges: Polish Jewish Relations ===
In an interview with Polcast in 2016, Rubenstein was called, "a charismatic and devoted bridge-builder." Rubenstein, speaking about Poland, said his mission ~~,~~ working with the March of the Living, had transformed since the original inception of the program in 1988. He referred to three developments:

1. The first was one that transformed from focusing solely on the Holocaust, to a broadened understanding of what the Polish people had undergone, because “the Poles suffered tremendously as well.” This transformation led to an appreciation of the sacrifices they went through in their history.
2. “The March [and Rubenstein] began to understand the complexity of Polish-Jewish relations, both the beauty and the remarkable civilization that centuries of Jewish life in Poland was able to flourish because of the welcoming fertile ground that Poles presented to the Jews, but also the difficult parts of that relationship and to look at both sides with an objective and fair-minded eye."
3. "To appreciate the tremendous thousand-years of Polish-Jewish history that preceded the Holocaust."

Subsequent to all of those changes, Rubenstein explained, “We also decided the following: that whatever conclusion you come to about the history of Polish Jewish relations, because it's a complicated subject, there is no excuse for not building bridges today. And we have had so many experiences, year after year after year, where people in Poland have reached out their hands to the Jewish community, and when we respond, it is something wonderful to behold.”

== Interfaith and Intercultural Work ==
In the area of Holocaust education, Rubenstein has advocated for positive relations between Poland and Jews of Polish heritage, emphasizing the 1,000 years of Jewish history in Poland, introducing Polish-Jewish dialogue on the March of the Living, as well as working to recognize the heroic actions of the Righteous Among the Nations, especially those of Polish origin.

He has been quoted as saying, "We can debate the history of Jewish life in Poland over the centuries – and there are many divergent views on this subject. But there is no excuse now for not reaching out to today's Poland, building bridges and fostering positive relations. We may not be able to forge a consensus about the past, but it is in our hands – indeed our obligation – to create a harmonious present and future for Jews and Poles."

As part of Toronto's annual Holocaust Education Week, he has spoken at a number of interfaith programs, including ones at the Holy Trinity Armenian Church and St. Ansgar Lutheran Church in Toronto.

=== The St. Louis Apology ===
On November 7, 2018, the Canadian government led by Prime Minister Justin Trudeau, issued a formal apology in the House of Commons for Canada's Holocaust-era record toward Jews, including its turning away of MS St. Louis and its None is Too Many policy.

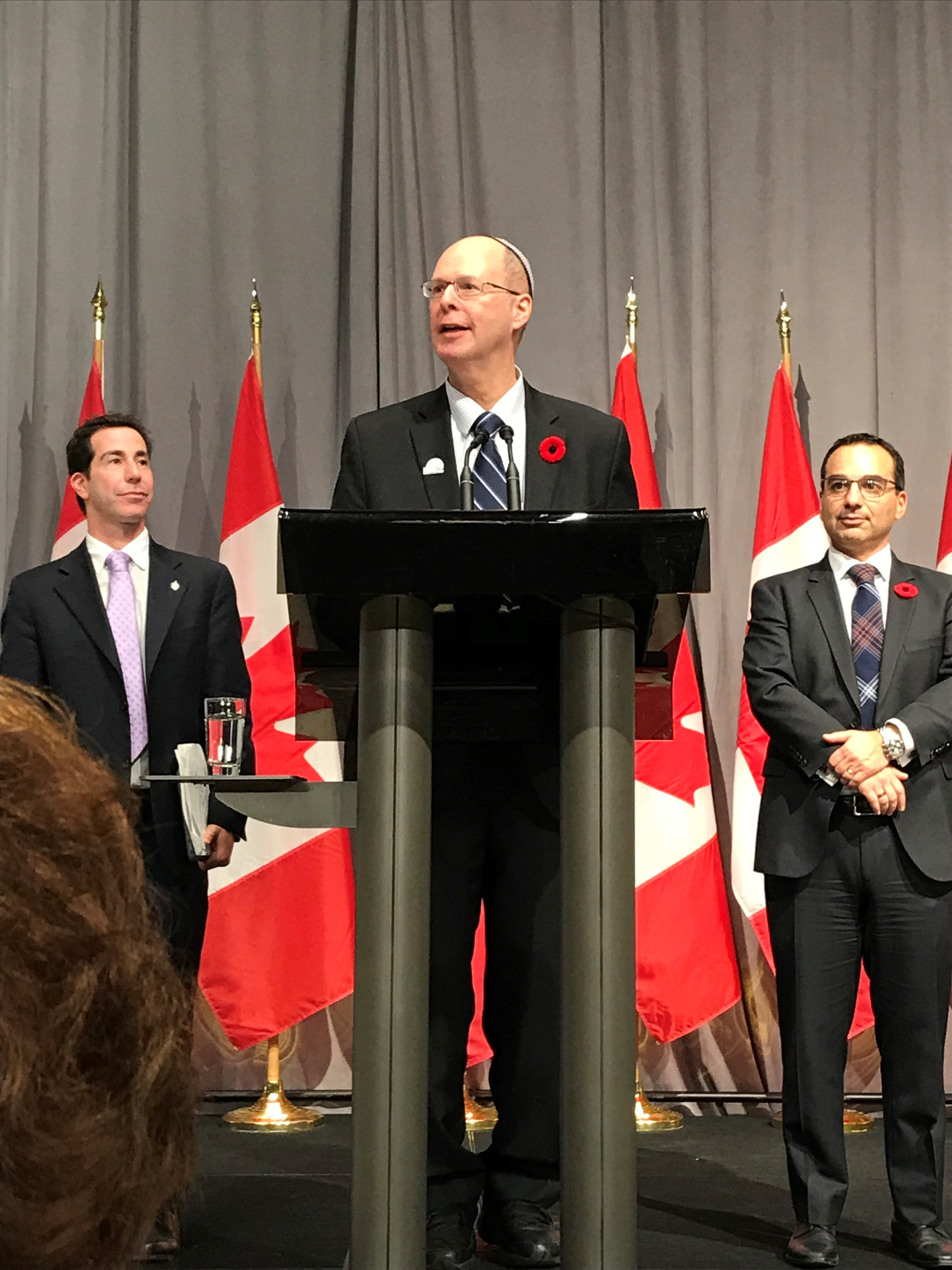
Eli Rubenstein speaking at the government organized event for the MS St. Louis apology, flanked by Liberal MPs Anthony Housefather and Michael Levitt

Speaking in Ottawa at a special ceremony after the event, where the Prime Minister, several ministers and a survivor of the St. Louis spoke, Rubenstein praised the Canadian government in his closing remarks:

"I asked a survivor I knew from Toronto what today was like for him. He said that, 'this was the most wonderful gesture a government could ever express', and this was echoed by a number of other survivors I spoke to. What a mitzvah, what a good deed, was done here today by our government! Elie Wiesel, of blessed memory, once said: Many people die twice. Once when they die, and once again when they are forgotten. So thank you, dear Prime Minister, and indeed all our political leaders, for making sure that the over 250 victims of St Louis, many who perished in Auschwitz/Birkenau, Sobibor, and other places, are never forgotten, so that they don't die a second death."

Rubenstein also commended the decision in the Canadian Jewish News, where he wrote: "Let us applaud our country and our elected officials for their ability to acknowledge Canada's errors and forge a new path forward. Countries, just like people, can perform the mitzvah of teshuvah (repentance)."

Speaking on January 27, 2019, in Ottawa, at a Library and Archives Canada event marking International Holocaust Remembrance Day, Rubenstein said: "I was never more ashamed to be a Canadian, than when I first read "None is Too Many" as a student attending York University in the early 1980s. But I was never prouder to be a Canadian, than when our government issued its apology for this historic wrong."

== Published works ==
In 1993, "For You Who Died I Must Live On...Reflections on the March of the Living" was published by Mosaic Press. The book was edited by Rubenstein, and featured the experiences from participants on the March from its first four years. It was subtitled, "Contemporary Jewish Youth Confront the Holocaust." The book won the 1994 Canadian Jewish Book Award.

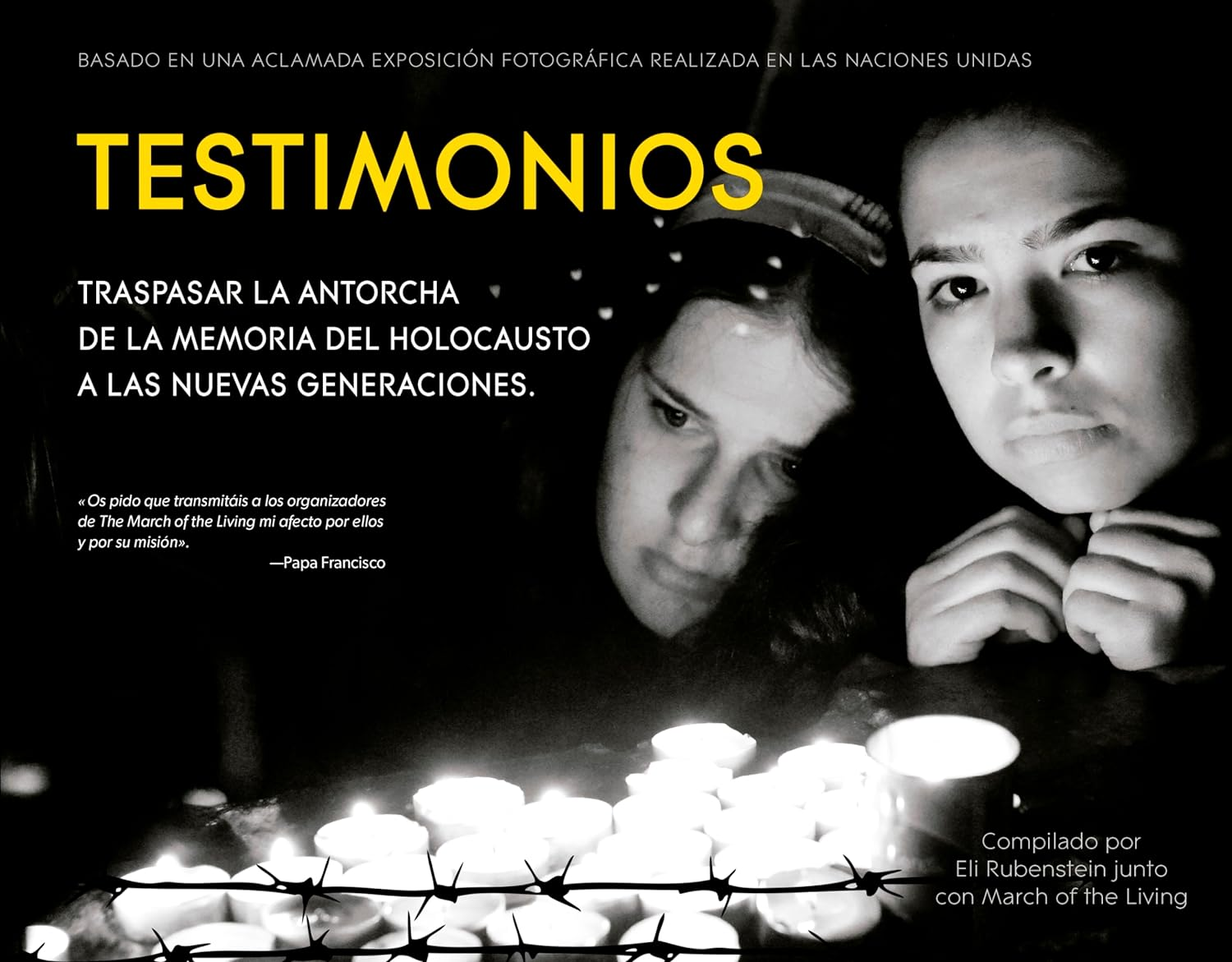
Spanish cover art for "Witness: Passing the Torch of Holocaust Memory to New Generations." Published by Second Story Press.

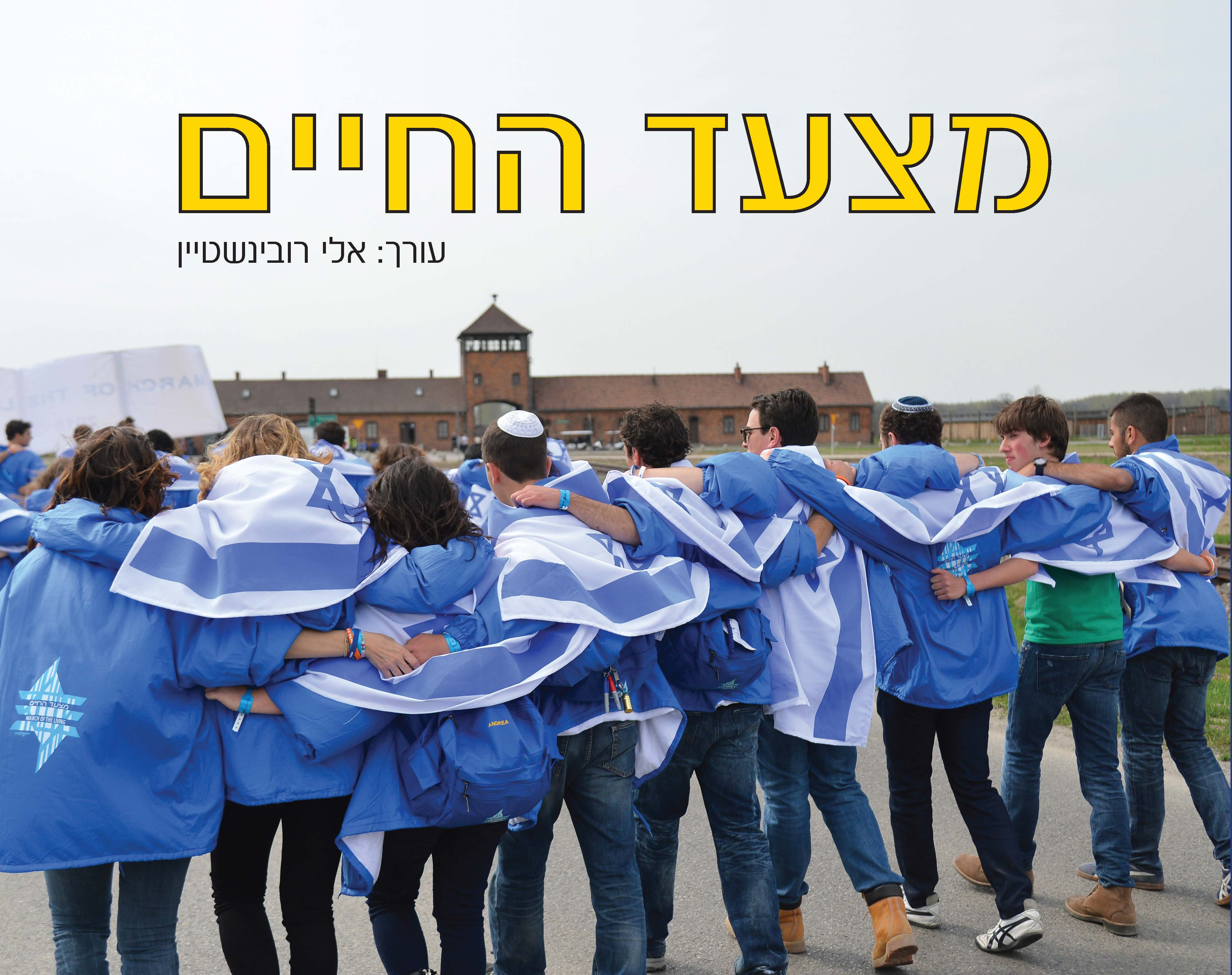
Hebrew cover art for "Witness: Passing the Torch of Holocaust Memory to New Generations." Published by Second Story Press.

In 2015, Witness: Passing the Torch of Holocaust Memory to New Generations, authored by Rubenstein, was published by Second Story Press. The book was "inspired by a 2014 United Nations exhibit of reflections and images of Holocaust survivors and students who traveled on the March of the Living since 1988." Spanish, Polish and Hebrew were also subsequently published. In 2020, a special edition of Witness appeared, commemorating the 75th Anniversary of the end of WWII and the liberation of Europe from Nazi tyranny, and included a section dealing with liberation stories of Holocaust survivors. The new edition also featured an afterword by Steven Spielberg, founder of the USC Shoah Foundation, as well as content from Pope John Paul II and Pope Francis related to the March of the Living and stories concerning the Righteous Among the Nations.

In July 2026, Rubenstein authored in collaboration with March of the Living, “When you listen to a witness, you become a witness,” an article published in The Jerusalem Post in collaboration with the International March of the Living to mark the tenth anniversary of Elie Wiesel’s death. The article examined Wiesel’s relationship with March of the Living, including his role on the Presidium of the inaugural 1988 March, his participation in the 1990 and 2005 marches, and the influence of his teaching on the organization’s emphasis on survivor testimony and intergenerational remembrance.

== Working Against Hatred and Prejudice ==
In 2001, Rubenstein founded of the March of Remembrance and Hope. The initiative focuses on teaching the severe impact of hatred and prejudice through the study of the Holocaust in Poland and Germany. Since its inception, many thousands of students worldwide, and from many faiths have taken part in the program. Rubenstein's belief in inclusion has kept bringing people together to learn about the effects antisemitism throughout history's examples.

Rubenstein introduced a number of Canadian Holocaust survivors to Justice Thomas Walther, Germany's last Nazi hunter. In 2015, with the testimony of these survivors at the trial of Oskar Gröning, a German SS member in Auschwitz, Walther successfully prosecuted Gröning. Known as the "bookkeeper of Auschwitz", Gröning was convicted of being an accessory to the murder of over 300,000 Hungarian Jews and was sentenced to four years in prison by a German court.

Rubenstein also interviewed Canadian residential school survivor, Chief Rodney Monague (1943-2013) of Christian Island.

== Appointment to The Order of Canada ==
In January 2023, after receiving appointment to the Order of Canada one month prior, Rubenstein was interviewed by Matt Galloway on CBC’s The Current as part of their segments on the recipients from the Office of the Governor General that year. Galloway introduced the segment by saying, "Another story of a Canadian doing extraordinary work from finding his calling as a child learning about the Holocaust to educating generations about antisemitism." Rubenstein's appointment to the Order of Canada was listed "For his significant contributions and innovative programs in Holocaust education as a writer, storyteller, film producer and community organizer."

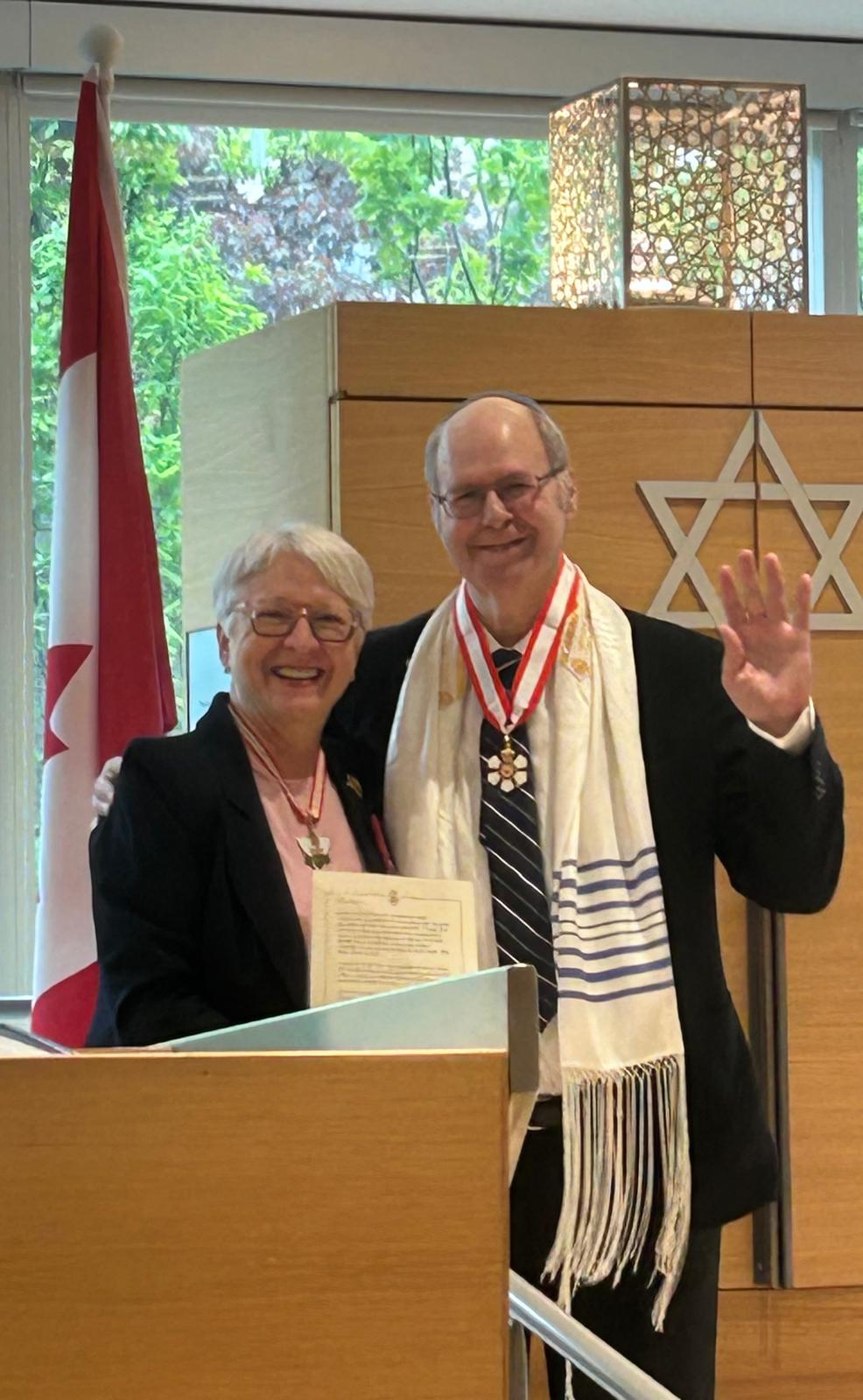
Left to right: The Honourable Edith Dumont, 30th Lieutenant Governor of Ontario and Rabbi Eli Rubenstein at Congregation Habonim Toronto on May 23, 2026. Credit: Alexis Slatt

Galloway asked when Rubenstein's interest in Holocaust education had started. Rubenstein explained, "My teachers, many of them were Holocaust survivors. I grew up seeing, as a matter of course, people with numbers on their arms, which were numbers the Nazis put on prisoners, and Auschwitz branded them like cattle. I grew up with that very, very sad part of human history as a part of my consciousness. And it was something that really bothered me and troubled me because, I was a child, I wanted to love the world. I wanted to appreciate the world. I wanted to see the beauty in the world. And then I was surrounded by examples of the exact opposite.....I was wondering, 'How could this have happened?' 'How can we understand this, and how can we make sure it doesn't happen again?--not to just to the Jewish people, but to any member of the human family? I grew up with that shadow of the Holocaust throughout my entire childhood and adolescence."

Rubenstein's long-standing commitment to March of the Living and what it means to be involved in Holocaust education were discussed. Rubenstein was asked, "What have you heard from those students who have heard those [survivor] stories firsthand in those places of horror?"

Rubenstein said, "The students embrace the survivors, they support the survivors, and they've committed to transmitting the memory of the survivors to the next generation. And they do it in a very universal way. They say it's not just about fighting antisemitism and hatred towards Jews. It's fighting against all forms of racism, injustice, and intolerance, and I should say, on the trip itself, the students give incredible support to the survivors."

=== Acceptance Speech (2026) ===
In a 2026 acceptance speech at Congregation Habonim, Rubenstein reflected on the honour, describing his initial disbelief and connecting the award to the broader Canadian values of memory, humility, public service, and community responsibility.

Rubenstein delivered his Order of Canada acceptance speech at Congregation Habonim on May 23, 2026. The event was attended by the Honourable Edith Dumont, Lieutenant Governor of Ontario. In the speech, Rubenstein recognized several members of the Habonim community who had also received the Order of Canada, including Lionel Schipper, Paul Godfrey, Paul Hoffert, Larry Tanenbaum, Vivian Rakoff, Michael Budman, Don Green, Kathleen Taylor, Bernard Zinman, Naomi Azrieli, and Gary Goldberg.

==== Holocaust education and survivor testimony ====
A major theme of Rubenstein’s speech was the importance of Holocaust memory and survivor testimony. He referred to survivor and educator Elly Gotz, also an Order of Canada recipient, and discussed the experiences of Holocaust survivors who rebuilt their lives in Canada. Rubenstein used survivor stories, including that of Robert Engel, to illustrate how Canada was experienced by many survivors as a place of freedom, safety, and renewal.

==== Canada, Holocaust refugees, and public memory ====
Rubenstein also addressed Canada’s historical record during the Holocaust, including the country’s restrictive immigration policies toward Jewish refugees and the legacy of None Is Too Many. He connected this history to later Canadian refugee policy, particularly the admission of Vietnamese “boat people” after the Vietnam War, and to the 2018 apology by Prime Minister Justin Trudeau for Canada’s refusal of the MS St. Louis and its broader treatment of Jewish refugees during the Nazi era.

==== Views on Canadian identity ====
In the speech, Rubenstein described Canada as a country shaped by humility, diversity, immigration, and the ability to confront historical wrongs. He praised Canadian culture, geography, music, humour, and pluralism, while also acknowledging serious challenges, including Canada’s treatment of First Nations peoples and the rise of antisemitism after October 7, 2023. Commenting about Canada itself, he said, "I love our Canadian sense of modesty - which is not feigned modesty - about our place in the world. We are proud of our country, but not overly proud."

==== Jewish community and antisemitism ====
Rubenstein stated that Canada’s Jewish community was facing an unusually difficult period marked by heightened security at Jewish institutions and increased fear within the community. He referred to security measures at synagogues and recent attacks or threats against Jewish institutions in Toronto, while expressing confidence that Canada could return to its best values of fairness, safety, and inclusion.

== Rabbinic Ordination ==
On May 7, 2026, Rubenstein was formally ordained as a Rabbi at Congregation Habonim Toronto, where he had long served as a religious leader before formally becoming a rabbi. In his sermon, he thanked the Shalom Hartman Institute for its confidence in him and accommodations, and also thanked Rabbi Donniel Hartman.

== Films: Producer/Co-Producer & Director ==
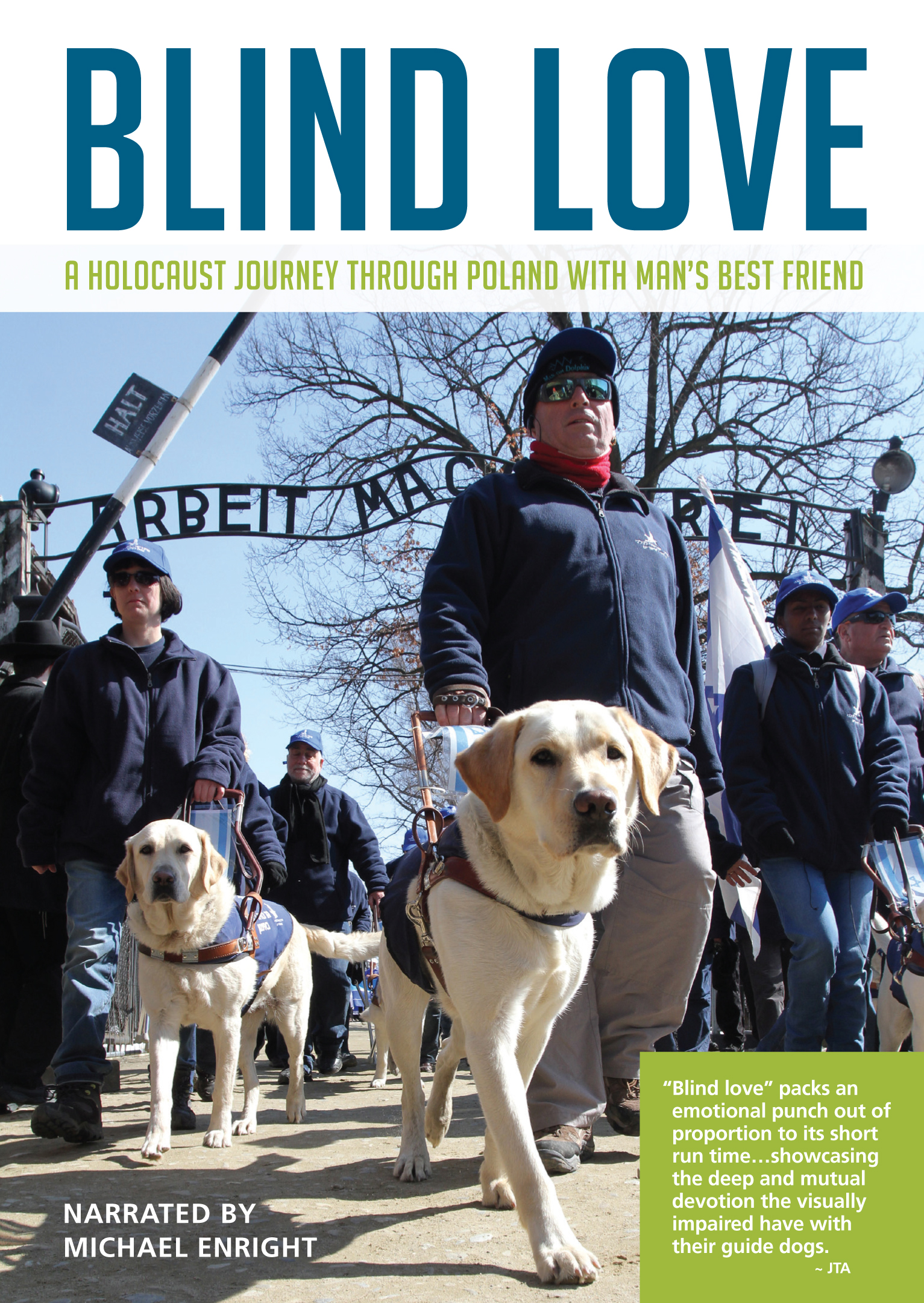
Blind Love trapsheet front

Blind Love: A Holocaust Journey to Poland with Man's Best Friend, a documentary that follows six blind Israelis traveling to Poland with the help of their guide dogs, to learn about the Holocaust. The film premièred in November 2015, at a special screening organized in conjunction with the Toronto Jewish Film Festival, and aired on CBC's Documentary Channel (Canada). It was screened at the Edmonton Jewish Film Festival in May 2016 as well. Rubenstein co-produced a short film, edited by Naomi Wise commemorating 85 years since the start of the first Kindertransport, when countries helped ship thousands of children out of Nazi occupied areas to safety. The film was released by International March of the Living, airing on Jewish Broadcasting Services in January, 2024. The film was titled, "If We Never See Each Other Again."

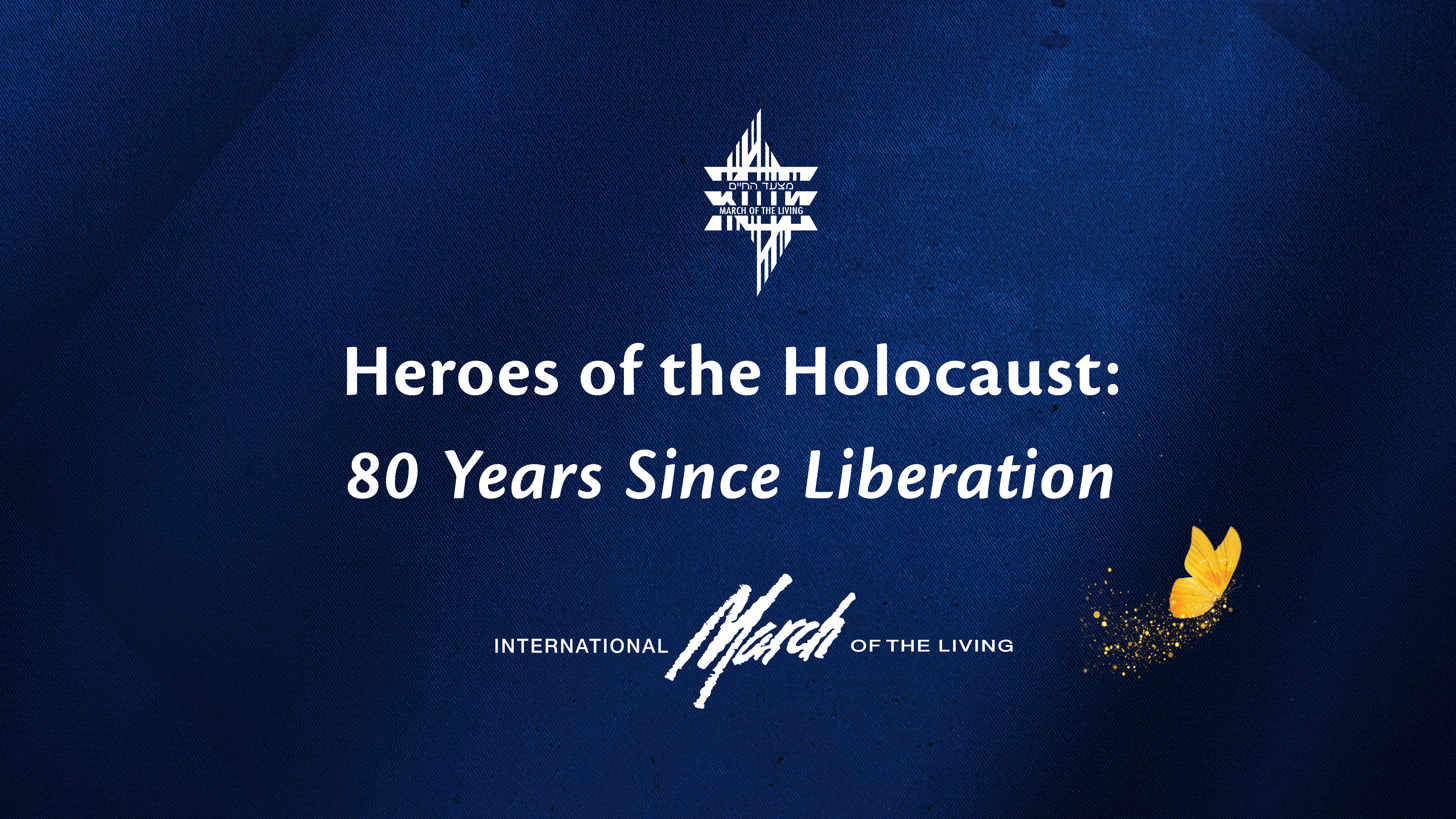
Heroes of the Holocaust: 80 Years Since Liberation

On June 4, 2025, Holocaust Survivor Day, the International March of the Living premiered the documentary Heroes of the Holocaust: 80 Years Since Liberation on i24 News and its YouTube channel. This film commemorated the 80th anniversary of the liberation of Nazi concentration camps and the end of World War II, with footage of an October 7th delegation and Survivors.

A 2026 documentary recorded Holocaust survivor, Nate Leipciger’s return to Auschwitz-Birkenau with the March of the Living, where he was joined by family members and young participants. The film presents his reflections on loss, survival, and the importance of passing Holocaust memory to future generations, drawing on his personal experiences at the camp more than eight decades earlier. The film was directed by Max Silverberg and produced by Rubenstein.

Several of the documentary films listed were directed or produced with award-winning Canadians, Fern Levitt and Naomi Wise.

=== Complete list Documentary Films ===
Title	Year
7 Days of Remembrance and Hope	2009
Twice Liberated	2013
Czeslawa & Olga	2013
Kindred Strangers - Matylda Liro & Michael Bulik	2013
Requiem for the Warsaw Ghetto	2013
To Live and Die with Honor: The Story of the Warsaw Ghetto Uprising	2013
100,000 Souls: The Legacy of Raoul Wallenberg	2014
I Am Anne Frank	2015
Anne Frank: 70 Years Later	2015
Lay Down Your Arms	2015
Auschwitz-Birkenau: 70 Years After Liberation; A Warning to Future Generations	2015
Blind Love: A Holocaust Journey to Poland with Man's Best Friend	2015
Point of No Return: The Nuremberg Laws	2016
Nuremberg Trials – Staying the Hand of Vengeance	2016
Candles of Kindness	2017
Without a Doubt - The Story of Franciszek Pasławski	2017
It Was The Right Thing To Do	2021
The Choice is Ours: Courageous Acts of Medical Professionals During the Holocaust	2021
Witness: Passing the Torch of Holocaust Memory to New Generations	2021
Full Circle – Ukrainian Family Saves Jewish Woman During Holocaust – Repaying Kindness 80 Yrs Later	2022
United We Stand: Black Soldiers Liberating Hitler's Camps and Jewish Activists in Civil Rights Movement	2022
Saving The World Entire	2023
If We Never See Each Other Again	2024
Heroes of the Holocaust	2025
There's Always A Better Tomorrow	2026

== Digital preservation of survivor testimony ==
In his 2026 book, Holocaust XR: Immersive Technologies as the Last Act of Testimony, Dr. Stephen D. Smith, the former executive director of the USC Shoah Foundation, explains Rubenstein role in pursuing the partnership between the Shoah Foundation and International March of the Living in utilizing 360° Testimony on Location.

Rubenstein shared with Smith that interest in 360° on-location testimony was based on surveys that showed that personal interaction with Holocaust survivors was the most compelling aspect of the journey for students, something that no other element of the program could replicate. He also noted that in a few years, students will no longer be able to hear Holocaust accounts directly from survivors themselves - underpinning the urgency to record their stories in the most compelling way possible.

“[According to Rubenstein] …the goals of Holocaust education are numerous—combating antisemitism, learning from the Righteous Among the Nations, building cultures of human rights and democracy. Rubenstein identifies one foundational purpose above all: “the most important goal is simply this: To tell the story. And no one did this better than the actual Holocaust survivors themselves.” Ensuring those stories are preserved in “the most compelling and vivid fashion” is, in his view, the precondition for all other educational aims—so that future generations may learn from them, combat Holocaust denial, and build a better world for all humanity.”

=== Awards ===
- 1994 Canadian Jewish Book Award
- 2008 Ve’ahavta Tikkun Olam Education Award
- 2013 Miklos Kanitz Holocaust and Human Rights Education Award
- 2022 Officer of the Order of Canada
