= Steve McCormick =

Steve or Stephen McCormick may refer to:

- Steve McCormick (footballer), Scottish footballer
- Steve McCormick (executive), former president of the Gordon and Betty Moore Foundation
- S. J. McCormick, printer, publisher and mayor in Oregon, United States
- Stephen J. McCormick (radio correspondent), American radio correspondent

== See also ==
- Steve McCormack, rugby league coach
