= Berkeley Institute =

Berkeley Institute may refer to:

- Berkeley Institute (New York) 1886-1956
- The Berkeley Institute, a public senior high school established in Pembroke Parish, Bermuda in 1897
- Berkeley Institute for Data Science part of University of California, Berkeley
