= Nicholson Catholic College =

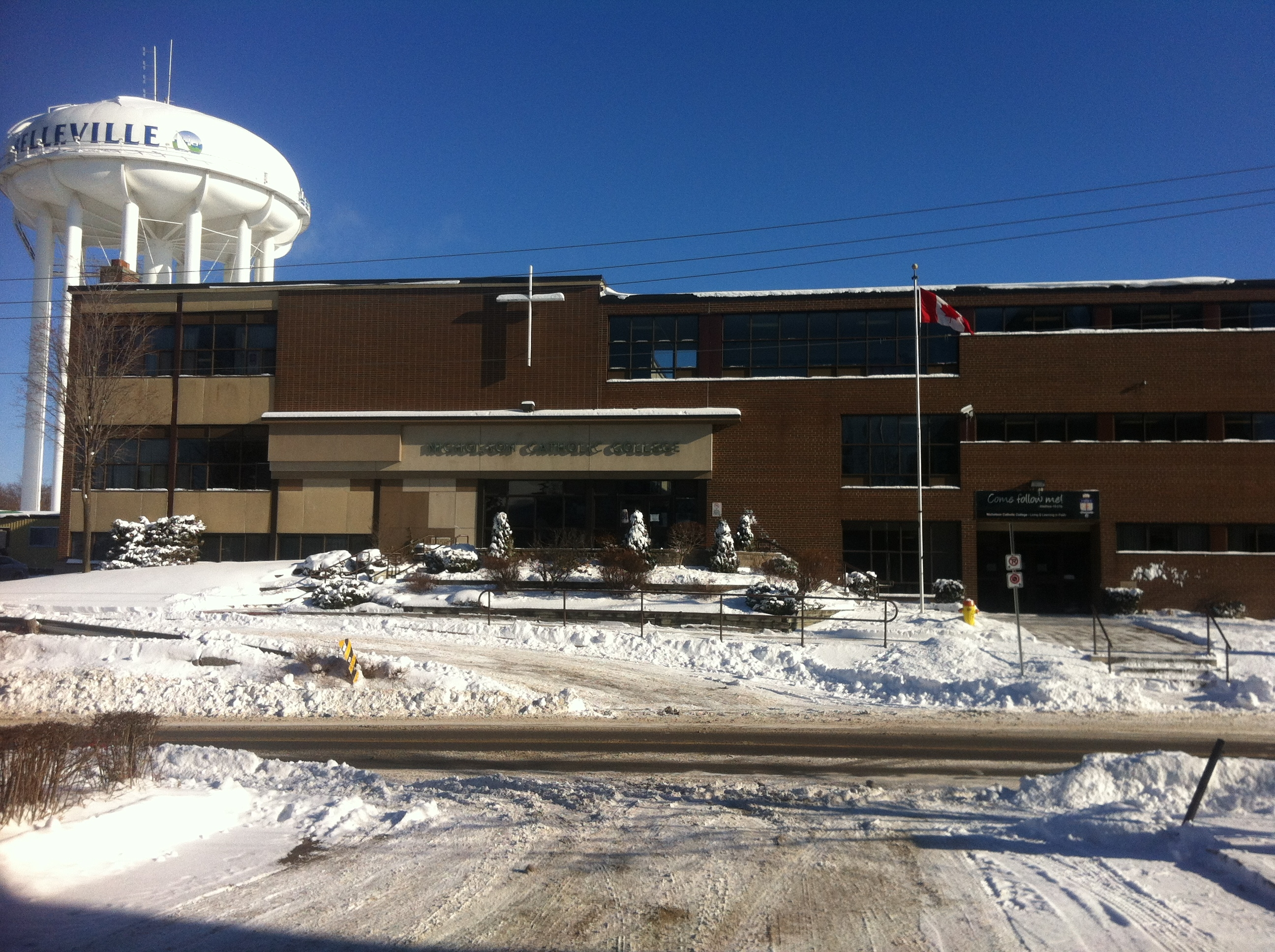

Location
- 301 Church Street; Belleville, Ontario, K8N 3C7; Canada; 44.16855°N 77.38236°W

Information
- Type: Secondary
- Motto: Quis ut Deus (Who is Like Unto God?)
- Established: 1960; 66 years ago
- School board: Algonquin and Lakeshore Catholic District School Board
- Superintendent: Michele McGrath
- Principal: Anne Barrett
- Grades: 7-12
- Enrolment: 415 (2021-2022)
- Language: English/French Immersion Program
- Colours: Green, White
- Mascot: Crusader Knight
- Team name: Nicks
- Website: nicc.alcdsb.on.ca

Nicholson Catholic College (NCC) is a Catholic secondary school in Belleville, Ontario, Canada. The school operates under the Algonquin and Lakeshore Catholic District School Board, and teaches students the Ontario Secondary School Diploma Curriculum as well as curriculum from the International Baccalaureate Programme. NCC is named after Monsignor J.F. Nicholson, V.G., P.A., with whose help and guidance a Catholic high school was first opened in Belleville. Monsignor Nicholson was the pastor of St. Michael's parish.

== History ==
Nicholson Catholic College first opened in September 1960, when it replaced the previous St. Michael's High-School which had been in existence since 1930. In 1960, Nicholson consisted of grades 11, 12, and 13. In 1965, Nicholson was expanded to include grades 9 and 10, when the Belleville Separate School Board opened Nicholson Senior School adjacent to Nicholson Catholic College. This new school addition also included a new and improved gymnasium, as well as 8 fully equipped classrooms.

Nicholson Catholic College was the only Catholic School in the Quinte region for many years after its founding. However, because students from all the surrounding area who were enrolled in the ALCDSB had only the choice to attend Nicholson, this meant that by the early 1990s Nicholson was far over its student capacity. To solve this problem, the school board planned the construction of two additional schools (St. Paul's and St. Theresa's Catholic Secondary School's) in the Bay of Quinte Region to facilitate students who were outside of the Nicholson C.S.S. bus zone. Because of this transfer of students, the enrollment numbers for students at Nicholson dropped significantly in the late 1990s from over 1,000 to the current number of just over 400 students.

== Administration ==
There are currently over 50 staff members at Nicholson Catholic College. The leader of the administration is the principal, followed by the vice principal. The administration generally operates with managerial elements and according to rigid policies set out by itself, the school board and the Ontario government. Students are not allowed to go against policy and have generally limited power to legally combat policies and the will of the administration, yet teachers have slightly more clout through unions such as OECTA.

== Academics ==
=== General Academics ===
Nicholson offers extensive transition supports to new students including a formal peer mentor program, shadow day experiences, dances for students in Grades 7 and 8 and focused Guidance support within both elementary and secondary environments. The school offers all courses that constitute the Ontario Secondary School Diploma curriculum as well as that of the IB Program.

Students who attend Nicholson Catholic College are taught under the Ontario Secondary School Diploma, or the IB World Education curriculum if they are enrolled in the program. From 2008 and onward Nicholson Catholic College has maintained a consistent school overall ranking of between 6.9 and 7.4 out of 10.

=== Experiential Education Opportunities ===
Nicholson Catholic College offers a range of Experiential Education Opportunities. Students at Nicholson can earn credits through experiential experiences called Co-op. Students will explore occupations and career interests through participation in real workplace experiences. Co-op education is an important element of the Specialist High Skills Major (SHSM) or Ontario Youth Apprenticeship Program (OYAP) training.

Nicholson offers three Specialist High Skills Major (SHSM) opportunities:

- Health and Wellness
- Transportation
- Communication Technology

Apprenticeship is a method of training in which employers train workers to become skilled workers through on-the-job training and classroom instruction. The Ontario Youth Apprenticeship Program is for students who have career plans to become an apprentice in the skilled trades. During secondary school, students will begin the theory and hands-on-experience required for apprenticeship while completing high school credits. The hands-on experience is obtained through the co-op program.

The Algonquin Lakeshore Technology Center (at Sir James Whitney School for the Deaf): The Algonquin Lakeshore School Board and Sir James Whitney School have formed a partnership in order to provide technological training for their students. Course offerings include Health and Personal Services, Hairstyling and Aesthetics, Transportation, Design, Manufacturing and Construction Technologies. These courses are offered off campus in two credit blocks. Nicholson is expanding the broad number of community partnerships to support experiential learning for students of all grade levels to build bridges to Apprenticeships, College programs and University programs

The Life Long Learning Center (Eastern Campus – Cobourg, Ontario): Students interested in the construction trades may apply for this program which prepares students who are interested in becoming a certified brick and stonemason, cement finisher or construction craft worker. After the five-week pre- apprenticeship program students are placed in the field of their choice and embark on their apprenticeship journey.

Dual Credit: School + College + Work: The Dual Credit Program provides secondary school student with the opportunity to earn up to 4 dual credits by participating in apprenticeship training and College courses. While enrolled in college dual credits you will earn both high school and college credit s for successfully completing a course at the college.

=== International Students ===
Nicholson Catholic College accepts over twenty-five international students who come from Asia, Germany, Mexico, and South America to enroll in the Ontario secondary school curriculum. These students stay with families in the community for the duration of their stay, which is usually no longer than one school year, although some choose to pursue Canadian post-secondary opportunities such as University or College. It is the purpose of the international student program that students from different countries will learn about culture, faith, and values in Canadian society. It is also hoped that the students in the school community who permanently reside in Canada will gain a genuine understanding and appreciation for different cultures through interaction with the exchange students.

=== IB School ===
At Nicholson, students have the option of taking either the full IB diploma program or select courses in what is known as an IB certificate. Students work towards both the diploma and the certificate program in grades eleven and twelve. The school currently offers HL Biology, HL Chemistry, HL Visual Arts, HL English A1, SL French B, SL World Religions, and SL Mathematics. However, the school sometimes allows students to take online courses, such as SL Spanish ab initio and HL Mathematics, through Pamoja online education under special circumstances. HL Biology is taught as IB Group 4 subjects, and as IB Group 6 subjects, students can choose to take either HL Chemistry or HL Visual Arts.

== Catholic school ==
=== School Community ===
Nicholson's school community also ties in with the values of Catholic Education.

== Extracurricular activities ==
=== Athletics ===
There are currently thirty teams that represent Nicholson in Bay of Quinte sanctioned sports. Men's and women's teams are presently running in:

- Badminton
- Basketball
- Volleyball
- Soccer
- Skiing
- Rugby
- Swimming
- Tennis
- Hockey
- Cross Country
- Track & Field
- Curling
- Golf

Men's baseball and women's softball are also available to Nicholson students.

To date, Nicholson teams have won over 130 Bay of Quinte Championships as well as 50 C.O.S.S.A. Championships. At the provincial level, Nicholson's athletic teams have captured numerous O.F.S.A.A. medals including: 3 gold, 2 silver and 2 bronze in gymnastics; 1 gold, 2 silver and 3 bronze in swimming; and 6 gold(1975, 2005, 2006, 2007, 2018, 2024), 2 silver (1991, 2016) and 3 bronze(1977, 2017, 2019) in basketball; 1 gold, and 1 Bronze in Soccer. The school has also been very proud to host O.F.S.A.A. Championships in basketball (4), volleyball (1) and golf (1).

=== Clubs and activities ===
Nicholson Catholic College has extra-curricular clubs and activities that do not involve athletics. Some examples of these clubs include, but are not limited to: the Games Club, the Travel Club, and the Badminton Club. Of special note is the Games Club at Nicholson, which is headed by Mr. Craig who is the recipient of several nationwide modelling and painting awards. Involvement in any school or community activity at Nicholson will help students earn points towards one of the school letters. The School Letter Recognition Program attempts to encourage involvement and reward participation.

==== Student Council ====
The NCC Student Council consists of a group of student representatives elected by the student body. The Student Council is responsible for organizing school wide activities, as well as to represent and advocate for NCC students at school and board levels.

NCC election processes involve an assembly where candidates present what they stand for and wish to do if elected, by means of a speech and/or a promotional video. The gathering together of students reinforces the concept of good democracy that promotes informed votes, and the element of a united Catholic school community.

Student Council members attend regular meetings of the ALCDSB Student Senate to discuss board wide issues with Student Council members from each of the five high schools. Occasional Student Senate meetings are hosted at NCC, as Student Senate meetings are hosted alternately at each school apart from Student Trustee elections and other important events which are held at the board office.

== Special events ==
=== School Dances ===
School dances are organized and run by the school's Student Council. Supervision is provided by staff members and police to ensure acceptable behavior. Each dance has a specific theme, which is voted on by students from a list of choices compiled by the Student Council. Oftentimes the music is provided by a hired DJ.

=== School Mass ===
Once a month students from all grades attend a worship service conducted at St. Michael's Catholic Church across the street from Nicholson. The mass is conducted by Father Richard Whalen, and the purpose is to encourage the student's spiritual development in the Catholic faith.

=== Grade 9 Fun Day ===
The Grade 9 Fun Day is held once a year to welcome all freshmen students to Nicholson Catholic College and to make them feel accepted into the school community. All Grade 9 students are divided up into teams which are all assigned a different color, and these teams participate in a wide variety of activities such as tug of war, bean bag tosses, and several other games.

=== 'Civvies' Day ===
'Civvies' Day at Nicholson Catholic College usually occurs on the last Friday of a month and is an exception to the school's uniform policy. On Civvies Days, students are encouraged to wear whatever clothes they want as long as it is not "rude, lewd, nude, or crude" according to the school's staff.

=== School Spirit Days ===
School Spirit Days are days where students can wear in clothing of their choice that is in line with a specific theme. These themes are usually decided upon by the student council, and these days generally occur as part of a 'spirit week', where every day is a different theme but which are widely related.

=== Clothespin Game ===
Held annually the Student council places the entire school population (staff and student alike) into brackets. In this contest participants receive a sheet of paper with an opponent's name on it and a clothespin. The goal of the game is to pin the clothespin on your opponent before your opponent does the same to you or the window of time (usually a day or two) runs out. The loser must then sign the opponent's sheet enabling the victor to proceed to the next round. If neither participant pins their opponent both are eliminated from the game. The game only takes place; during breaks and lunch periods, only on school property and washrooms are off limits. The game is taken very seriously by many people resulting in; modified clothespins, spying on enemies schedules, ambushes and intense 'duels'. In recent years the final two participants partake in a duel in front of the entire school (on the stage of the providence gym).

=== Annual road race ===
Held annually in the spring, where students from all grades compete in a road race around the east end of Belleville near the school. The top female and male each year are awarded with their names on a plaque.

== Notable alumni ==
- Nick Cousins, professional Canadian ice hockey forward
- Andrew Shaw, professional Canadian ice hockey forward
- Marc Crawford, professional Canadian ice hockey head coach.
- Lou Crawford, professional Canadian ice hockey head coach
- Andrew Raycroft, professional Canadian ice hockey goaltender
- Erin Davis, broadcaster and author

== See also ==
- List of school districts in Ontario
- List of high schools in Ontario
- Education in Ontario
