= Regiopolis-Notre Dame Catholic Secondary School =

Coordinates: 44.24326°N 76.49366°W

Regiopolis - Notre Dame Catholic Secondary School
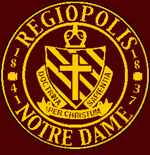

Location
- 130 Russell St. Kingston, Ontario, K7K 2E9; Canada

Information
- School type: Secondary
- Motto: Doctrina Sapientia Per Christum (Learning, Knowledge, Wisdom through Christ)
- Religious affiliation: Catholic
- Established: 1841; 185 years ago
- School board: Algonquin and Lakeshore Catholic District School Board
- Principal: Amy Goodberry
- Grades: 9-12
- Enrollment: Aprx. 1238
- Language: English, French
- Colours: Garnet and Gold
- Mascot: Panther
- Team name: Panthers
- Website: regi.alcdsb.on.ca

Regiopolis - Notre Dame Catholic Secondary School (sometimes abbreviated to RND or "Regi") is a secondary school located in Kingston, Ontario, Canada offering grades 9 to 12. It is one of three schools in Kingston that offer the International Baccalaureate (IB) program, and is Canada's oldest English Catholic high school.

== International Baccalaureate Diploma program ==
At Regiopolis-Notre Dame, the International Baccalaureate program boasts smaller-than-average class sizes and strong student-teacher connections with an emphasis on philosophic and critical thought. With over a thousand students attending RND, the "IB experience" offers peer interaction on a smaller scale with the option of joining the school's many extracurricular teams, clubs, and activities.

Pre-International Baccalaureate occurs in grades 9 and 10. In Grade 11 (Year 1 IB) and 12 (Year 2 IB), students are enrolled in the Diploma program. Simultaneously, these students also earn credit towards the provincial OSSD diploma. Some students opt to participate in earning IB Certificates as an alternative to the full IB Diploma program.

== History ==
The Diocese of Kingston under Bishop Alexander Macdonell obtained a charter from the Legislative Assembly of Upper Canada on March 4, 1837 to establish the College of Regiopolis. Construction began in 1839 and the institution opened in 1842. A sister school for girls, Notre Dame was founded in 1841.

Regiopolis originally functioned as a secondary school, seminary and college and was given university status and degree granting powers in 1866. However, due to financial difficulties, the college closed in 1869. In 1892, Regiopolis' five story stone building on Sydenham Street became the new location of Hotel Dieu Hospital.

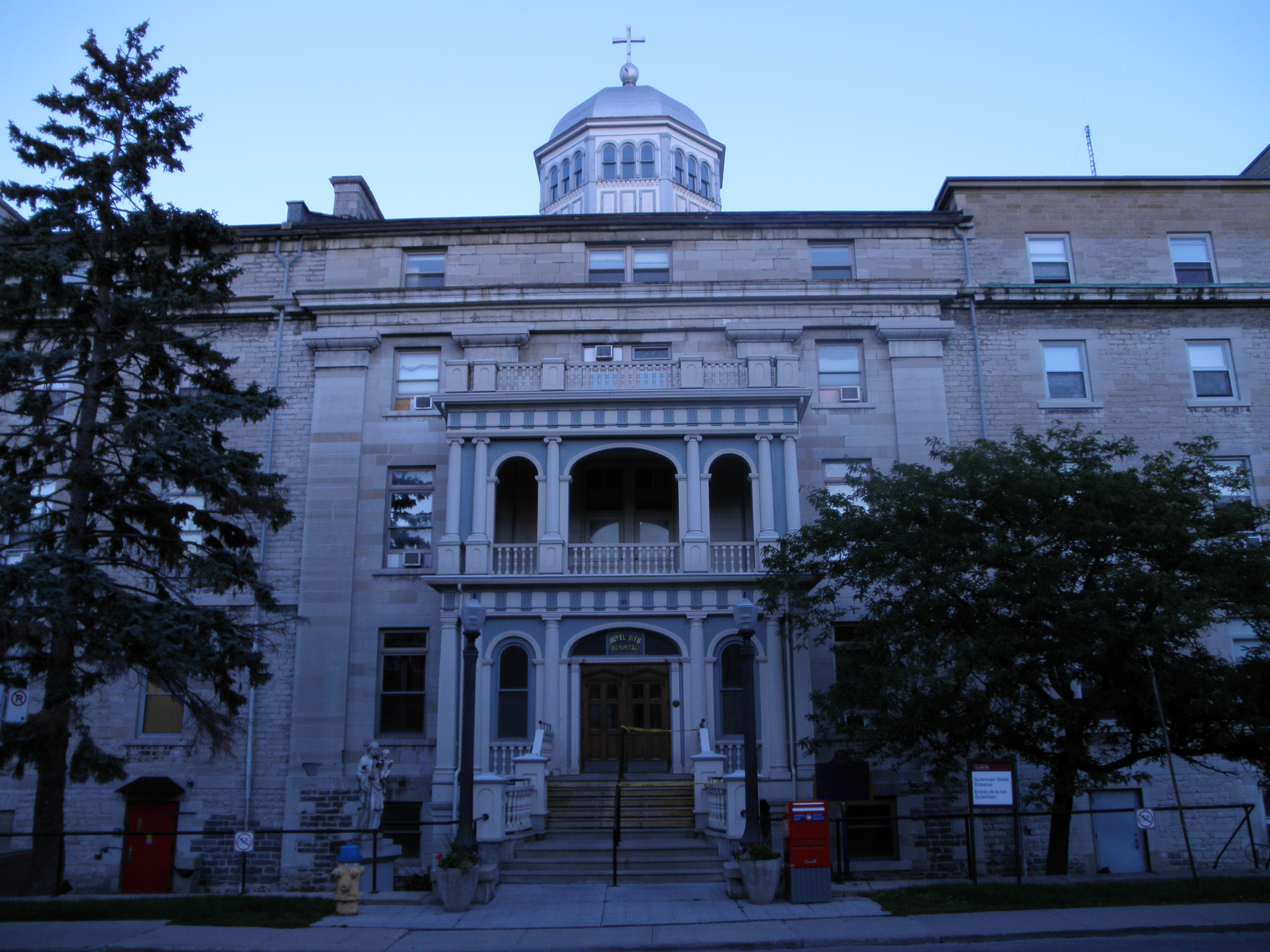
In 1892, William Newlands Jr. (architect) converted Regiopolis' five story stone building on Sydenham Street, Kingston, Ontario as the new location of Hotel Dieu Hospital.

Also in 1892, James Vincent Cleary, Kingston's first archbishop, reopened Regiopolis College on King Street as a secondary school for boys. In 1914, the school moved to its present location on Russell Street in northern Kingston. William Newlands Jr. (architect) designed the main building (1914), dormitory and gymnasium (1925).

The Jesuit Fathers of Upper Canada took over operation of the school in 1931 and operated it for the next forty years. They utilized Regiopolis' university charter to graduate six Bachelor of Arts recipients in 1941 and 1942 but abandoned the post-secondary project once and for all due to low enrollment and limited resources.

The Congregation of Notre Dame was invited to Kingston by Bishop Macdonnell to establish a girls' school. They began conducting classes in 1841, first on King Street and then in a house on Earl Street. In 1846, they established a permanent school at the corner of Bagot and Johnson Streets and remained there until the late 1960s.

The two schools were merged in 1967 when operating costs became too high for separate boys' and girls' institutions to be viable and moved to the Regiopolis College site taking the name Regiopolis-Notre Dame. The Jesuit Fathers withdrew from the operation of the school in 1970 and the Frontenac Lennox and Addington County Roman Catholic Separate School Board took over jurisdiction while the Sisters of Notre Dame continued their involvement.

The present building opened in 1977 and expanded twice, in 1993 and 2004. The 2004 expansion added a second gym to the school called the CND gymnasium, which now is the site of most Regi sporting events (such as Basketball, Volleyball, Badminton), school masses, and spirit rallies. For the fall 2024 sports season Regi spent 1.3 million dollars on renovating their grass sports field which was used for sports such as soccer, football, field hockey. The school brought in a new grass field, sprinkler system, asphalt track (which is now used for track and field), and a new fence. The track was made to be 400m with 100m starting lines painted on. The project was funded by the Ministry of Education.

== Athletics ==
Regiopolis-Notre Dame currently fields teams in both boys and girls divisions - including soccer, basketball, volleyball, football, field hockey, track and field, badminton, tennis, hockey, rugby, wrestling, skiing, curling, golf, and cross country. RND sports teams use the name "Panthers" - the previous "Redskins" name was dropped due to its insensitivity. School colours are Garnet and Gold.

In sports Regi's main rivals are the Holy Cross Saints and the Kingston Secondary School Bears

Regi's senior boys' volleyball team has won Ontario Federation of School Athletic Associations (OFSAA) gold on four separate occasions - in 2002, 2009, 2010, and 2014 The senior boys' soccer team also captured an OFSAA gold medal in 2006. Regi is also home to the national ranked co-ed cheerleading national champions (2001-2011).

The school hosts a yearly rivalry football game at Richardson Stadium against the Holy Cross Saints, in which junior and senior players participate, which is known as "Friday Night Lights".

Regi and Kingston Secondary School host a yearly school rivalry hockey game which is played at the Kingston Memorial Centre.

== Notable alumni ==
- Cory Greenwood, NFL former player of Detroit Lions, Kansas City Chiefs, Toronto Argonauts, Calgary Stampeders
- Gerald Bull, engineer and artillery developer, designer of the Project Babylon "supergun"
- Scott Harrington, hockey player of Belleville Senators
- Bonnie Henry, Chief Medical Officer of Health, British Columbia
- Abi Tripp, Paralympic swimmer
- Peter Cullen, Voice actor
- Robert Gibson (rower), Olympic Rower

== See also ==
- Education in Ontario
- List of secondary schools in Ontario
