= Karthik Ram =

Data scientist

Karthik Ram

Karthik Ram is a research scientist at the Berkeley Institute for Data Science and member of the Initiative for Global Change Biology at the University of California, Berkeley. He is best known for being the co-founder of rOpenSci. Ram's work focuses on global change, data science, and open research software.

== Career ==
Ram received his PhD in Ecology and Evolution at University of California, Davis. After his PhD, he went on to hold a post-grad position at University of California, Santa Cruz before eventually moving to UC Berkeley. Currently, Karthik Ram is a research scientist at UC University of California, Berkeley for both the Berkeley Institute for Data Science and the Berkeley Initiative for Global Change Biology. His work aims to make it easier for scientists to produce reproducible research.

== Projects ==
Ram co-created rOpenSci in 2011, and is currently the lead of the project. rOpenSci is non-profit with the goal of making data retrieval more accessible through open source R packages. He also a member of the peer-review and editorial staff for the rOpenSci Software Review. Ram is the lead principal investigator for the URSSI (US Research Software Sustainability Institute). Karthik Ram has been the lead of this project since its initial grant in December, 2017. Ram is a founding editor of the Journal of Open Source Software, and an editorial board member of ReScience C and Research Ideas and Outcomes, which are both academic journals focused on open research sustainability.

== Awards ==
- Leamer-Rosenthal Prizes for Open Social Science (2007)
- rOpenSci awarded $2.9M grant from The Leona M. and Harry B. Helmsley Charitable Trust

== Notable works ==
Among Ram's notable work are the following:

- Point of view: How open science helps researchers succeed
- Git can facilitate greater reproducibility and increased transparency in science
- Data carpentry: workshops to increase data literacy for researchers
