= Dan Hammer =

American economist

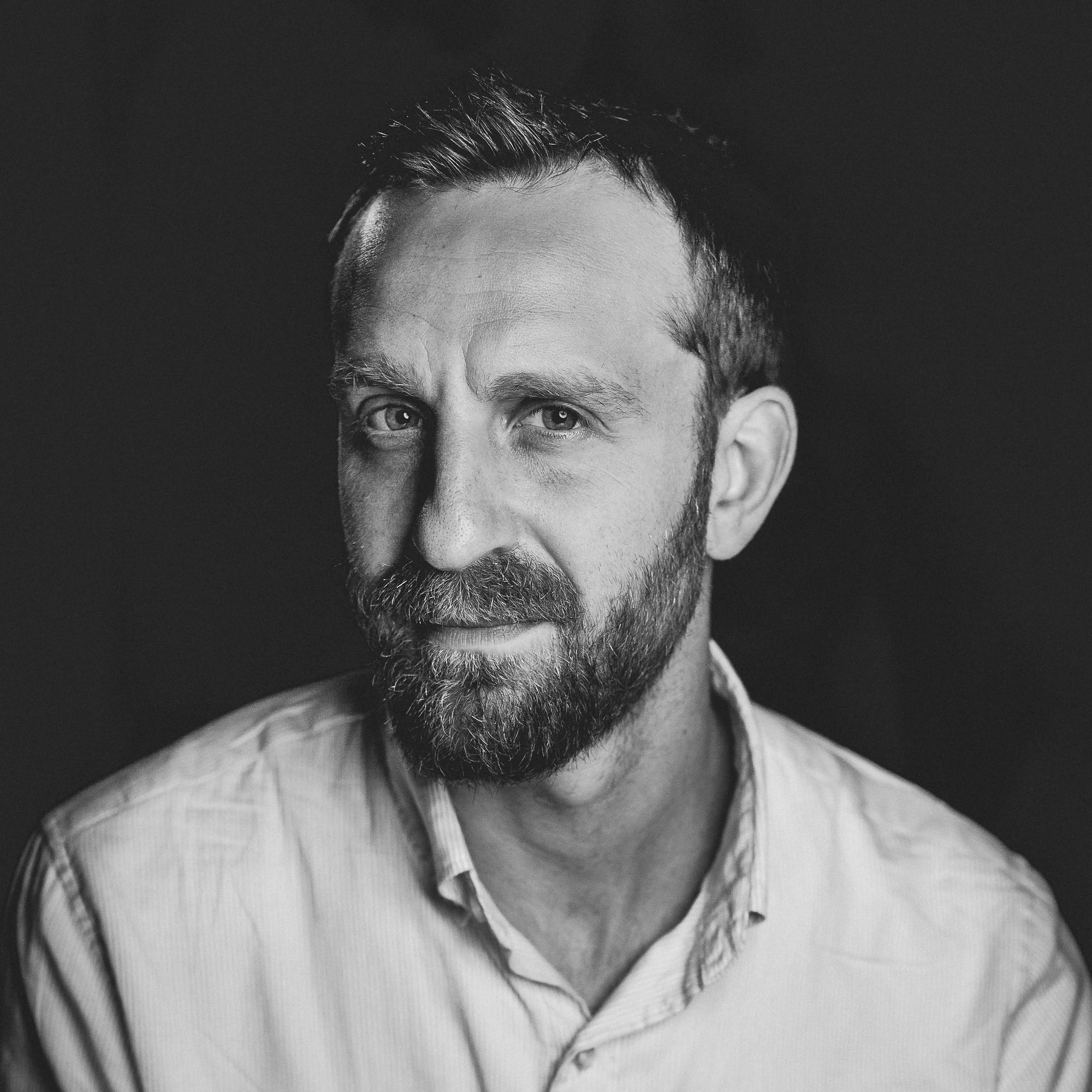

Academic background
- Education: University of California, Berkeley (PhD, 2017), Swarthmore College (BA, 2007)

Academic work
- Discipline: Environmental economics
- Institutions: University of California, Berkeley, Berkeley Institute for Data Science

Dan Hammer is an environmental economist and winner of both the inaugural Pritzker Award and the Mark Bingham Award for Excellence in Achievement by Young Alumni at UC Berkeley. He is the cofounder of LGND, an AI infrastructure company for Earth observation data; Ode, a mission-driven technology and design agency known for building digital products for Jane Goodall, Al Gore, and WWF; and Clay, a nonprofit open-source initiative developing a large Earth observation foundation model. Ode's projects have earned numerous awards, including several Webby and Anthem awards.

Hammer is a National Geographic Fellow, and served as the Senior Policy Advisor to the U.S. Chief Technology Officer Megan Smith in the Obama Administration. He was the Presidential Innovation Fellow who released the first API listing for NASA, amounting to the data infrastructure design for the space agency's public data. In addition, prior to NASA, Hammer was the Chief Data Scientist at the World Resources Institute, where he helped re-launch Global Forest Watch, an open-source project to monitor deforestation.

== Notable work ==
Hammer was a third-round Presidential Innovation Fellow, working with the NASA Chief technology officer for Information Technology to design software infrastructure to access the agency's open data. Prior to working at NASA and with the White House Office of Science and Technology Policy, he wrote the open-source algorithms that served as the initial data set for the Global Forest Watch reboot, and directed the Data Lab at the World Resources Institute. He has published a series of peer-reviewed articles about environmental policy and conservation, which are widely cited in the popular press on issues of climate change and forest/habitat conservation. Hammer has held adjunct or lecturer positions at UC Berkeley and the University of San Francisco. He was a Fellow at the Berkeley Institute for Data Science, Faculty at Georgetown University, and works with Steve McCormick (former CEO of The Nature Conservancy) on web service infrastructure for environmental information.

Hammer's recent work with satellite imagery has been used to monitor territorial disputes in the South China Sea, the Xinjiang re-education camps, and the October 2017 Northern California wildfires.

Hammer has spoken at TEDxMIT on AI and Earth observation and TEDxBerkeley on environmental technology and storytelling.

== Early work and education ==
Hammer was a Thomas J. Watson Fellow and traveled to Polynesia to build and race outrigger canoes. He graduated from Swarthmore College in 2007 with high honors in mathematics and economics, where he was a Lang Opportunity Scholar to support community firefighters in Bolivia. Hammer subsequently worked as the research assistant to the current Chief Economic Adviser to the Government of India, Arvind Subramanian, and the President of the Center for Global Development, Nancy Birdsall. Hammer received his PhD in Agricultural and Resource Economics from the University of California, Berkeley.
