= Hotel Dieu Hospital (Kingston, Ontario) =

Hotel Dieu Hospital site
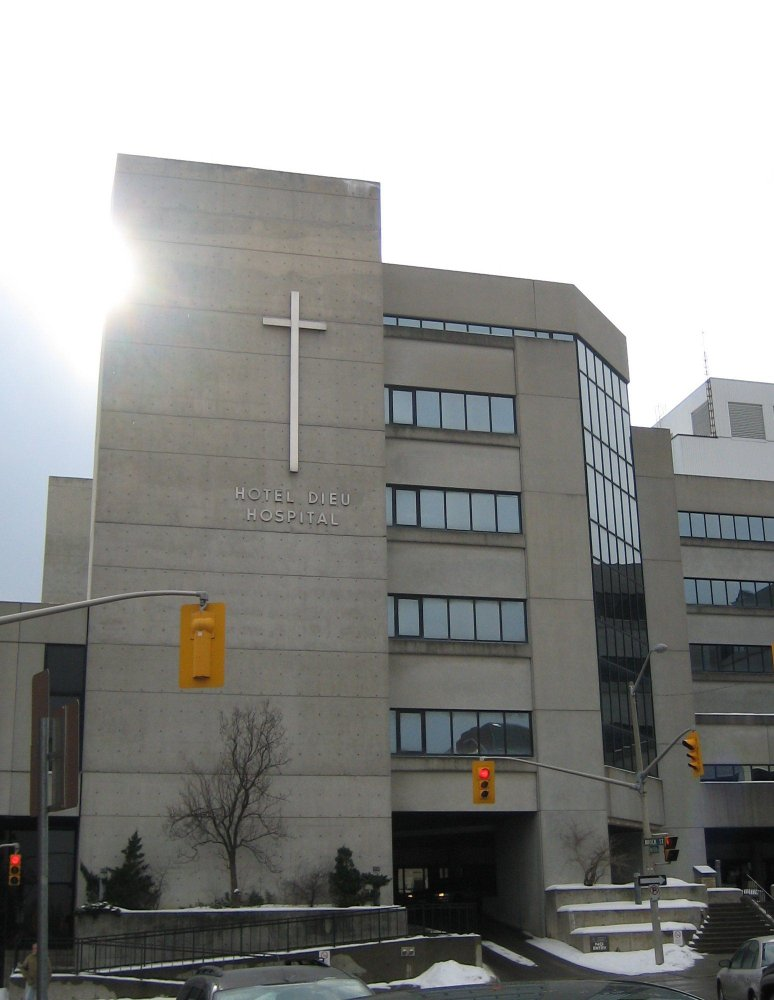
- Hotel Dieu Hospital site

Geography
- Location: 166 Brock Street; Kingston, Ontario, Canada
- Coordinates: 44°13′51″N 076°29′09″W

Organization
- Care system: Public Medicare (Canada)
- Type: Teaching
- Affiliated university: Queen's University

Services
- Emergency department: No - Urgent Care Centre
- Speciality: Ambulatory care services

History
- Founded: September 4, 1845

Links
- Website: www.hoteldieu.com
- Lists: Hospitals in Canada

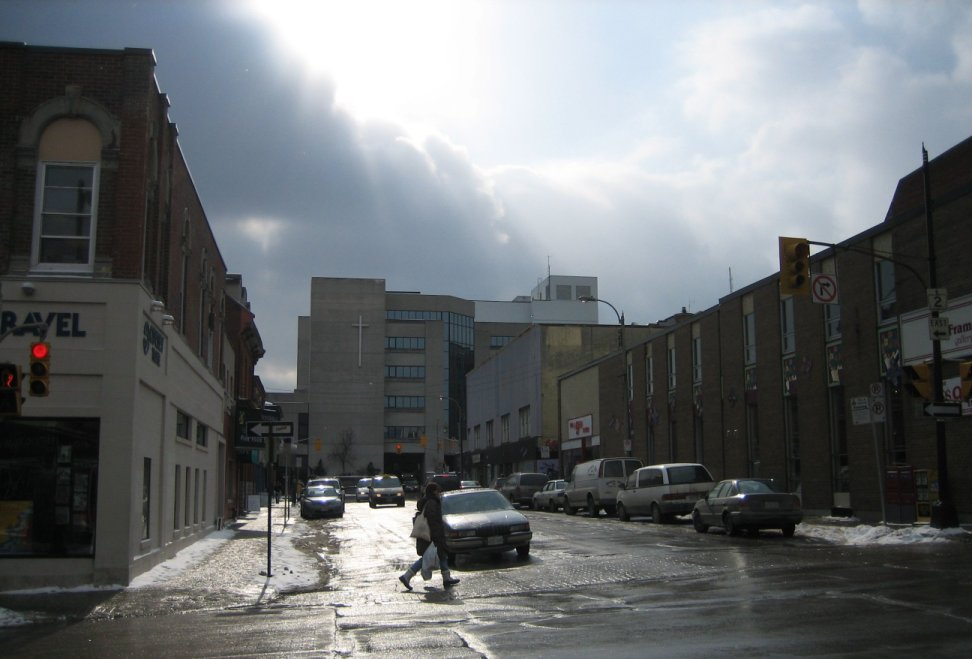
Hotel Dieu Hospital from a distance.

Hotel Dieu Hospital site is a Catholic hospital in Kingston, Ontario, Canada and part of Kingston Health Sciences Centre. It is affiliated with Queen's University, and is a partner site with Kingston General Hospital, delivering health care, conducting research and training the health care professionals.

== History ==
In 1841, the Catholic bishop of Kingston, Remigius Gaulin, asked the Religious Hospitallers of Saint Joseph (RHSJ) of Montreal to send a group of sisters to establish a Catholic Hospital in his city to provide care for the poor Irish Catholic immigrants in the city. The RHSJs, however, were unable to find suitable buildings for their hospital until 1845. On September 2, 1845, Mother Amable Bourbonnière along with Sisters Huguette Claire Latour, Emilie Barbarie, and Louise Davignon, accompanied by their benefactress, Miss Joséphine Perras and Mr. Laframboise, a friend of the community, arrived in Kingston. They stayed with the Kingston Notre Dame Sisters for two days, and then moved into their hospital, located in a small limestone building, now 229 Brock Street, on September 4, 1845. The Kingston RHSJs saw their first patient on September 7. By the end of October, they had refurbished and moved into their monastery, located at 233 Brock Street, allowing them to have a men's ward on the main floor of the hospital and a women's ward on the second floor.

The hospital was in operation when the city suffered an epidemic of typhus in 1847. In addition to ill and dying patients, Hotel Dieu cared for 100 orphaned children who had lost their parents. The disease had accompanied poor Irish immigrants fleeing the famine in their homeland. No one yet understood how the disease spread, and poor sanitation practices compounded the epidemic.

In 1892, the hospital was moved to its present location on Sydenham Street, which formerly housed Regiopolis College. The original college building is now the Sydenham Wing of the Hotel Dieu Hospital.

The main wing of the Hotel Dieu Hospital, the Jeanne Mance Wing, completed in 1984, is named for a woman sent by the RHSJ to New France in 1641. Jeanne Mance, a lay woman, was given the responsibility of founding a hospital and caring for the sick in New France. In 1642, she arrived in what is now Montreal and founded the first Hotel Dieu Hospital in 1645.

The Hotel Dieu Hospital site is the second oldest public hospital in Canada still in operation with most of its buildings intact.

== Services ==
=== Urgent Care Centre ===
The hospital's Urgent Care Centre is meant for people with injuries or illnesses that are non-life-threatening. All patients who are ambulatory and who are experiencing minor illness or injuries that cannot wait for a family doctor are directed to attend this clinic. The Urgent Care Centre is open from 8 a.m. – 8 p.m. on weekdays, and 8 a.m. to 2 p.m. Saturdays and Sundays.

=== Clinics ===
- Outpatient pediatrics
- Cardiology
- Ophthalmology
- diabetes education
- breast assessment
- Day surgery
- Urgent care and mental health programs

== St. Joseph's School of Nursing ==
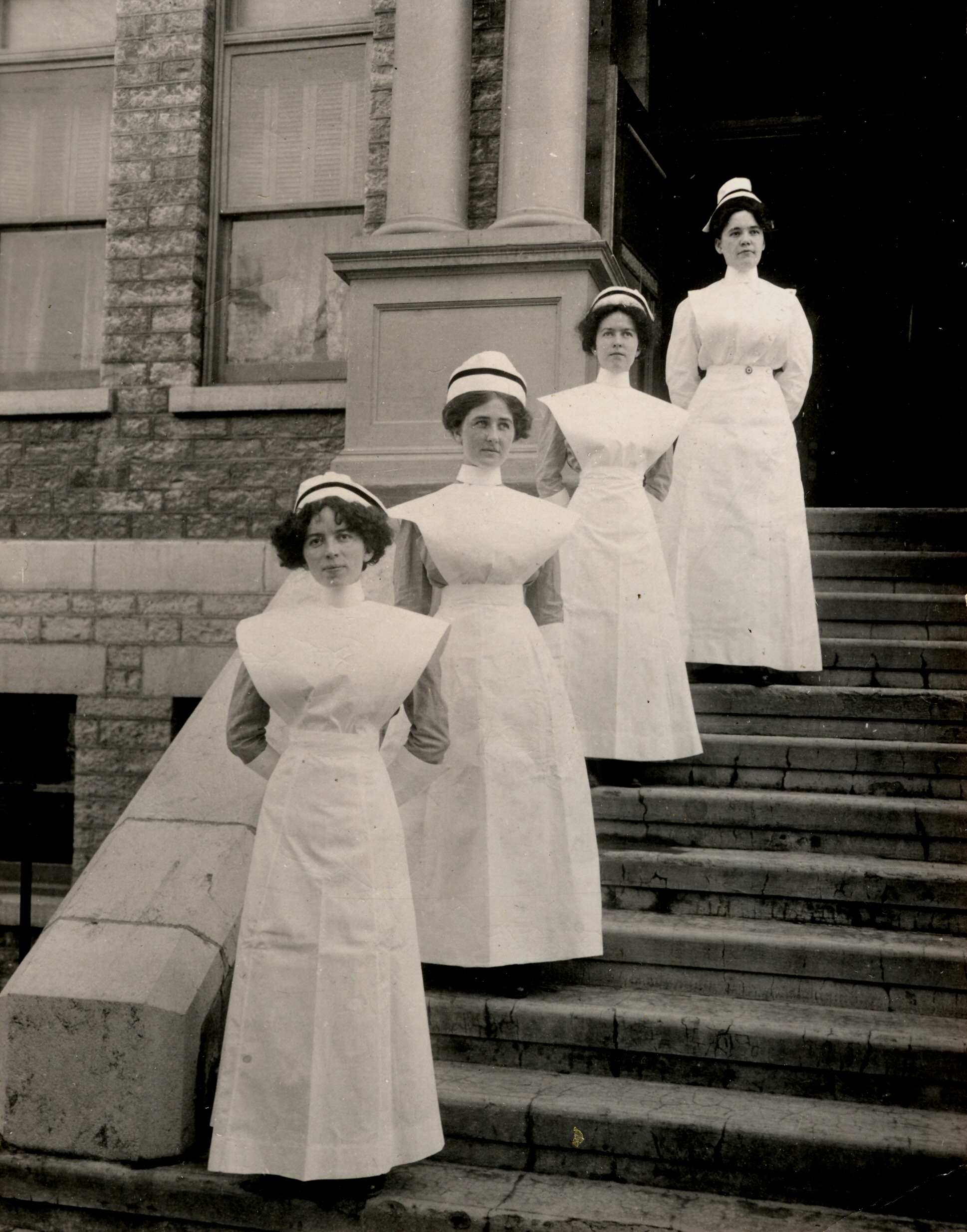
St. Joseph's School of Nursing, Hotel Dieu Hospital, Kingston, Ontario Class of 1914

In 1912 the Religious Hospitallers of St. Joseph established a nursing school in Kingston at Hotel Dieu Hospital. This became necessary as Sisters could no longer care for the increasing number of patients at the hospital. Training, which was initially provided by nursing Sisters and doctors at the hospital, ended with the graduate earning a three-year diploma. It became a two-year program in 1970 The first class graduated in 1914 and the final class was the Class of 1974. In total, 1695 nurses graduated from the school The school was closed in 1973 as all hospital-based diploma nursing programs in Ontario were transferred to Colleges of Applied Arts and Technology. The Class of 1974 spent their first year at the Hotel Dieu and their second at St. Lawrence College.

=== Notable graduates ===
- Marion Dewar, public health nurse, later Mayor of Ottawa and federal Member of Parliament.

== See also ==
- Kingston General Hospital
- Providence Continuing Care Centre (PCCC)
