= Erin Davis =

Canadian broadcaster

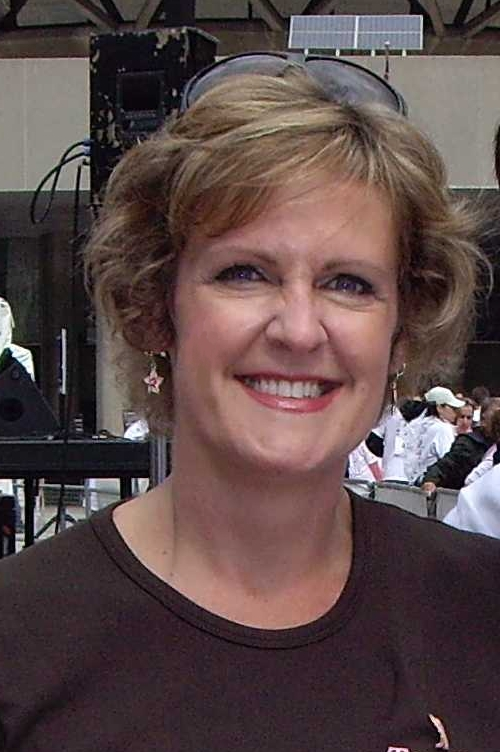
- Born: September 26, 1962 (age 64); Edmonton, Alberta, Canada
- Occupation: Broadcaster
- Spouse: Rob Whitehead
- Children: Lauren Davis (1991–2015)
- Parent(s): Don Davis; Maureen Ellen Davis (nee Moore 1933–2012)
- Website: Erin Davis's Official Homepage

Erin Davis is the author of the book Mourning Has Broken: Love, Loss and Reclaiming Joy (HarperCollins, 2019) and a former media figure in Toronto, Ontario. A 2020 inductee into the Canadian Broadcasting Hall of Fame, she was the longtime host of 98.1 CHFI's Morning Show until her retirement on December 15, 2016.

== Early life ==
Davis was born in Edmonton, Alberta in 1962 to Royal Canadian Air Force officer Don Davis and his wife Maureen. Along with her 3 sisters, Davis's childhood was spent in many different cities, as is typical of an Air Force family. She was raised in Ottawa and Trenton, Ontario, and England. Growing up, she was always interested in music and singing, regularly joining her grandfather's orchestra.

When she graduated from high school (Nicholson Catholic College), she decided to pursue her performing further by studying Radio Broadcasting at Loyalist College in Belleville, Ontario. While she was there, she also kept busy hosting a radio show on CIGL-FM in the afternoons and playing piano at a local restaurant in the evenings.

== Radio career ==
=== Early work ===
After graduating from Loyalist College, was immediately hired by CIGL-FM. Six months later, she moved to Windsor, Ontario to work at CKLW Windsor (aka The Big Eight), where she has the distinction of being the first female co-host in the Detroit market. Davis co-hosted the morning show on CKLW during its final years as a Top 40 station, and, along with many other employees of the station, was laid off in late 1984 when the station went to a mostly-automated Music of Your Life format. From there, she moved to Toronto, Ontario to co-host Good Morning Toronto at CKO Toronto, the flagship station of Canada's all-news radio network. This job led to her big breakthrough, when in September 1988, she was asked to join popular morning show host Don Daynard on the CHFI morning show.

=== Working at CHFI ===
Shortly after Davis joined Daynard, 'Don and Erin' became the top rated morning show in the market. In March 1991, Davis gave birth to her daughter Lauren Davis. Thanks to the station setting up a temporary studio in her home, Davis was able to return to the air only one week later and broadcast the show from home for the next three months. Together, Don and Erin maintained high ratings through 1999, when Don Daynard retired and was replaced by Bob Magee as Davis's co-host in the mornings. Together the new duo 'Bob and Erin' continued to maintain the high ratings up until spring 2003, when CHFI station executives decided to take the station in a different direction and released Davis, moving Magee to the "afternoon drive" shift. CHFI's morning drive time was given to Mad Dog and Billie, later called Jay and Billie, with Jay Michaels and Billie Holiday.

=== Released from CHFI ===
After her sudden departure from radio, since the non-compete clause in her contract forbade her from being hired by another radio station for a year, Davis used her time to pursue other goals. In the summer of 2003, the W Network offered her a chance to create her own daily live national television talk show. That fall she starred in W Live with Erin Davis, featuring guests and viewers discussing women's lifestyle, health and wellness issues.

Also that summer, Davis was contacted by Ross Petty, a theatrical producer who was organizing his annual Christmas family pantomime in Toronto. He invited her to audition for and she made her live theatre debut as the Fairy Godmother in Cinderella at Toronto's Elgin Theatre in December for a monthlong run, concurrent with her daily television show.

=== Working at EZ-Rock ===
On September 7, 2004, about 14 months after her abrupt departure from CHFI, Davis returned to Toronto radio. CHFI competitor EZ-Rock had an opening in their morning show when host Christine Cardoso left on maternity leave. After polling their listeners for ideas, Davis was an easy choice. On EZ-Rock, she joined Mike Cooper hosting the morning show.

=== Return to CHFI ===
Davis's stint with EZ-Rock ended earlier than expected in April 2005, when it became known that she had agreed to return to CHFI the following September. In addition, it was learned that Mike Cooper would be leaving EZ-Rock and joining her as co-host on the morning show at CHFI once his 6-month non-compete clause expired in late October. Together the two reunited at CHFI and continued to go strong there, putting CHFI back at the top of the Toronto ratings and holding it there.

After Cooper's retirement in February 2016, Davis introduced CHFI listeners to Darren B. Lamb, formerly of CHUM-FM, until her own retirement in December 2016. She and her husband now live in North Saanich, British Columbia, where they have family.

== Off-air work ==
While doing the morning show with Davis also made several appearances on TV. She made a number of guest host appearances on CFTO (now CTV Toronto) and Global. Following that, Davis wrote and performed a nightly commentary on CFTO News in 1998 and 1999 called "Just So You Know". Then for more than 200 episodes across two seasons, she hosted a nightly talk show on Rogers Television called The Erin Davis Show. The lifestyle and wellness program received an award in its second season as Canada’s best cable talk show. Davis hosted a live one-hour TV show called "W Live with Erin Davis" on the W Network in 2003/04.

=== Public appearances ===
Davis regularly appeared at various public events as both M.C. and keynote speaker. She is also an accomplished vocalist and fronted an oldies band for over 10 years. She was featured on three CDs for the Toronto Blue Jays and Variety Club during the team’s pennant and World Series runs of the early 1990s. Davis has also sung national anthems at many Blue Jays, Maple Leafs and Argonauts games, and boasts a winning record for the home team.

=== Charity work ===
Davis has participated in numerous charitable causes. For several years she was one of the co-hosts on the Easter Seals Telethon on CBC television. She is also very active with the Canadian Breast Cancer Foundation and has also worked for Sheena’s Place and the Children's Wish Foundation of Canada, for which she raised over $160,000 in the summer of 1998, simply by shaving her head. Davis has been saluted by Rotary International (Paul Harris Fellowship), the Empire Club, Variety Club and Toastmasters International for her public service work. In 2008, she established the Erin Davis Women in Media Award at her alma mater, Loyalist College.

== Honours and awards ==
For all of her work in the Toronto media, as well as her public speaking and charity work, Davis has been honoured by many different public organizations. In 2020, Erin is to be inducted into the Canadian Broadcasting Hall of Fame. In 2002, she was named Chatelaine Woman Of Influence. In 2006, she was awarded the title of Woman of the Year for the Greater Toronto Area after a public survey by the Consumers Choice Award. Later that same year, she also acted as Grand Marshal of the 2006 Toronto St. Patrick's Day Parade. And more recently, she has received the Paul Harris fellowship, a Rotary honour recognizing the highest public service.

== Podcasting ==
Erin now hosts three popular podcasts. Drift With Erin Davis is a collection of original sleep stories she writes and narrates. She cohosts Gracefully & Frankly with friend and fellow former Toronto radio personality Lisa Brandt. And Erin hosts the Real Time podcast for CREA, the Canadian Real Estate Association.
