= Algonquin and Lakeshore Catholic District School Board =

Roman Catholic school board in Ontario, Canada

Location
- 151 Dairy Ave; Napanee, Ontario; K7R 4B2 Canada
- Coordinates: 44°15′19″N 76°56′55″W

District information
- Chair of the board: Mr. Terry Shea
- Director of education: Mrs. Carey Smith-Dewey
- Schools: 32 Elementary; 5 Secondary; 5 Adult Learning Centres; 2 Outdoor Education Centres
- Budget: CA$163 million

Students and staff
- Students: 12,800

Other information
- Elected trustees: 10
- Student trustees: 2
- Website: www.alcdsb.on.ca

Algonquin and Lakeshore Catholic District School Board (ALCDSB) is a separate school board in Ontario, Canada. The school board is the school district administrator for Roman Catholic schools in the western portions of Eastern Ontario, including Napanee, Kingston, Belleville and Quinte West.

== Elementary schools ==
- Archbishop O'Sullivan Catholic School
- École Catholique Cathédrale
- Georges Vanier Catholic School
- St. Francis of Assisi Catholic School
- Holy Name Catholic School
- Holy Name of Mary Catholic School
- Annex - St. Mary Catholic School (Shannonville)
- Holy Rosary Catholic School
- J.J. O'Neill Catholic School
- Annex - St. Patrick Catholic School
- John XXIII Catholic School
- Mother Teresa Catholic School
- Our Lady of Fatima Catholic School
- Our Lady of Lourdes Catholic School
- Our Lady of Mercy Catholic School
- Annex - St. Martin Catholic School
- Our Lady of Mount Carmel Catholic School
- Sacred Heart Catholic School
- Sacred Heart Catholic School
- St. Carthagh Catholic School
- St. Genevieve Catholic School
- St. Gregory Catholic School
- St. Joseph Catholic School
- St. Marguerite Bourgeoys Catholic School
- St. Martha Catholic School
- St. Mary Catholic School
- St. Michael Catholic School
- St. Patrick Catholic School
- Annex - St. Mary Catholic School
- Annex - St. James Major Catholic School
- St. Patrick Catholic School
- St. Paul Catholic School
- Annex - Sacred Heart Catholic School
- St. Peter Catholic School
- St. Peter Catholic School
- St. Thomas More Catholic School
- Annex - St.Joseph/St. Mary Catholic School

== Secondary schools ==
- Holy Cross Catholic Secondary School, Kingston
- Nicholson Catholic College, Belleville
- Regiopolis-Notre Dame Catholic High School, Kingston
- St. Paul Catholic Secondary School, Trenton
- St. Theresa Catholic Secondary School, Belleville

== ALCDSB Student Senate ==
The Student Senate of the Algonquin and Lakeshore Catholic District School Board is a board wide level of student government that is composed of representatives from each of the school board's five secondary schools: Regiopolis Notre Dame, Holy Cross Catholic Secondary School, St. Theresa Catholic Secondary School, Nicholson Catholic College, and St. Paul Catholic Secondary School. Some of the student senate's purposes include representing the voice of all ALCDSB students, establishing and strengthening communication and a transfer of knowledge between the student councils of each secondary school, and to enact short and long term initiatives to better the student environment in the ALCDSB.

== See also ==
- List of school districts in Ontario
- List of high schools in Ontario
