= Journal of Open Source Software =

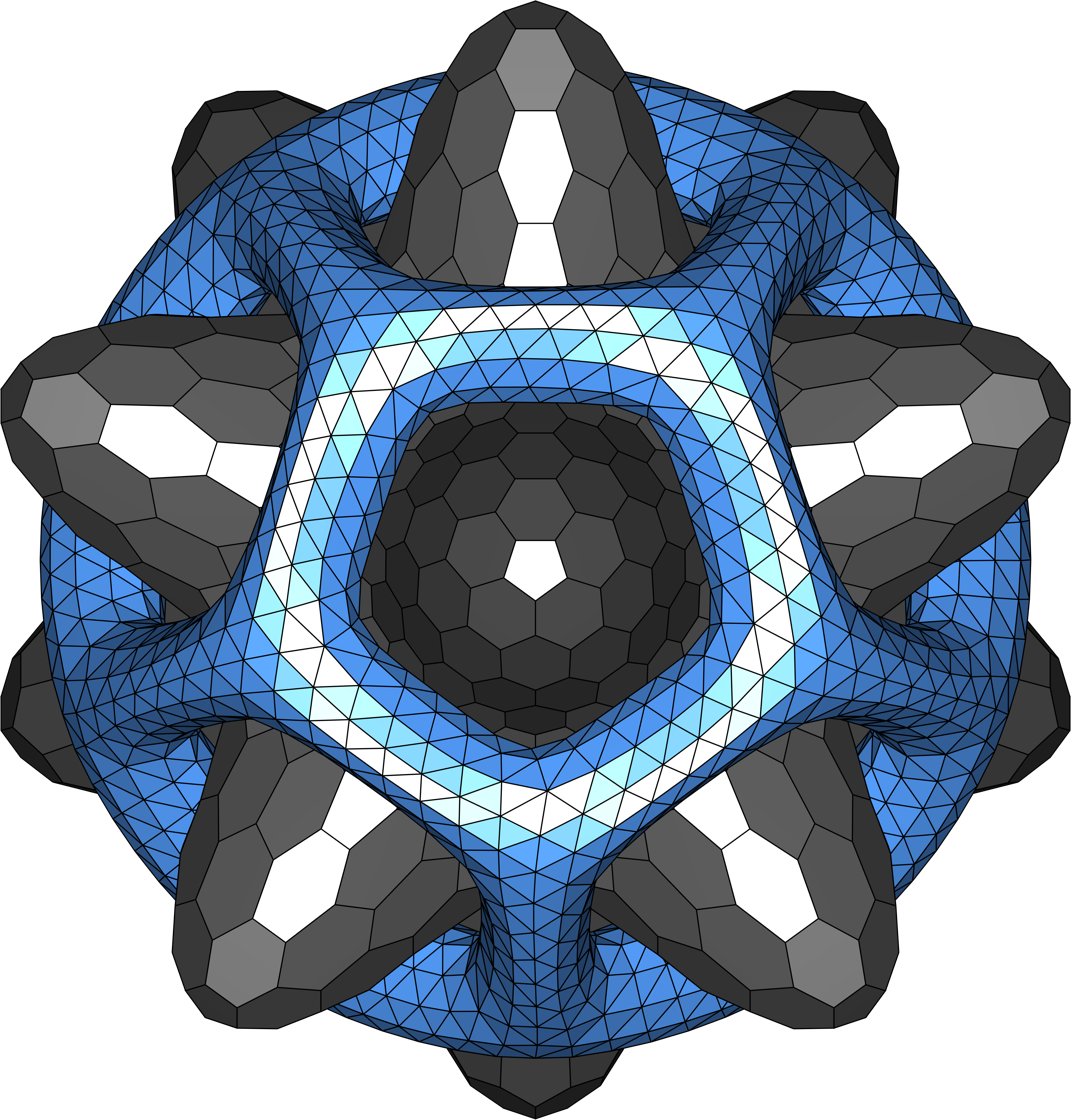
- Discipline: Software engineering
- Language: English
- Edited by: Arfon Smith

Publication details
- History: 2016–present
- Frequency: Continuous, upon acceptance
- Open access: Yes
- License: CC-BY 4.0

Standard abbreviations
- ISO 4: J. Open Source Softw.

Indexing
- ISSN: 2475-9066
- OCLC no.: 971252162

Links
- Journal homepage; Online archive

The Journal of Open Source Software is a peer-reviewed open-access scientific journal covering open-source software from any research discipline. The journal was founded in 2016 by editors Arfon Smith, Kyle Niemeyer, Dan Katz, Kevin Moerman, and Karthik Ram. The editor-in-chief is Arfon Smith (Space Telescope Science Institute). The journal is a sponsored project of NumFOCUS and an affiliate of the Open Source Initiative. The journal uses GitHub as publishing platform.

The journal was established in May 2016 and in its first year published 111 articles. It has been discussed by its editors in several peer-reviewed papers which describe its publishing model and its effectiveness.

== Abstracting and indexing ==
The journal is abstracted and indexed in the Astrophysics Data System and in the DBLP computer science bibliography online database.
