= Matt O'Donnell (Canadian football) =

Canadian football player (born 1989)

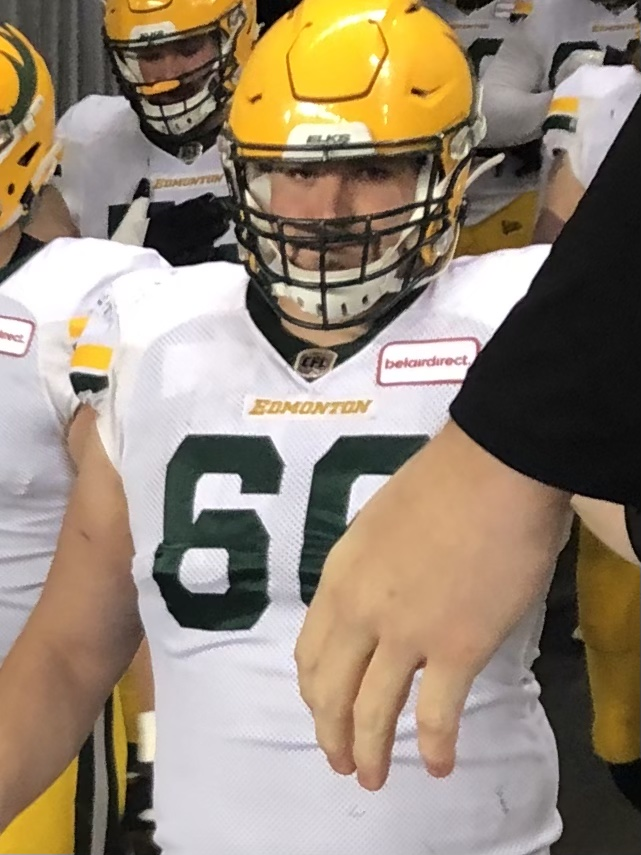
- O'Donnell with the Edmonton Elks in 2021

No. 66
- Position: Offensive lineman

Personal information
- Born: March 26, 1989 (age 37); Comox, British Columbia, Canada
- Listed height: 6 ft 11 in (2.11 m)
- Listed weight: 310 lb (141 kg)

Career information
- High school: Holy Cross (Kingston, Ontario)
- University: Queen's (2007–2010)
- CFL draft: 2011: 2nd round, 15th overall pick

Career history
- 2011–2012: Cincinnati Bengals*
- 2012–2014: Edmonton Eskimos
- 2015: Cincinnati Bengals*
- 2015–2021: Edmonton Eskimos / Elks
- * Offseason or practice squad member only

Awards and highlights
- Grey Cup champion (2015); CFL All-Star (2017); 2× CFL West All-Star (2017, 2019); Vanier Cup champion (2009); 2× First-team All-Canadian (2009, 2010); J. P. Metras Trophy (2010)
- Stats at CFL.ca

Matthew O'Donnell (born March 26, 1989) is a Canadian former professional football offensive lineman who played ten seasons with the Edmonton Eskimos/Elks of the Canadian Football League (CFL). He is a Vanier Cup champion after winning with the Queen's Gaels in 2009 and he is a Grey Cup champion after winning with Edmonton in 2015. He is also a two-time CFL West Division All-Star and was named a CFL All-Star in 2017.

== Early life ==
O'Donnell played high school football at Holy Cross Catholic Secondary School in Kingston, Ontario.

== University career ==
O'Donnell played CIS football for the Queen's Gaels from 2007 to 2010. He was named a CIS All-Canadian in 2009 and 2010 at offensive tackle. On December 17, 2010, it was announced that O'Donnell was one of two CIS players to be named to the East–West Shrine Game.

== Professional career ==
=== CFL ===
In the Canadian Football League's Amateur Scouting Bureau final rankings, he was ranked as the 11th best player for players eligible in the 2011 CFL draft, and sixth by players in the CIS. O'Donnell was chosen in the second round and 15th overall by the Saskatchewan Roughriders. He was the fourth offensive lineman taken in the draft, but was the highest CIS offensive lineman selected.

=== NBA ===
On May 31, 2011, it was reported that O'Donnell had chosen to delay his signing with the Roughriders due to the NBA's Boston Celtics putting him through a workout session in June. This move was seen as peculiar given the fact that he had not played basketball since high school.

O'Donnell also received interest from the Toronto Raptors and he attended a workout in June 2011.

=== Cincinnati Bengals ===
On July 26, 2011, O'Donnell signed a contract with the Cincinnati Bengals one day after the 2011 NFL Lockout. In December 2011, O'Donnell signed a 2-year extension with the Bengals. He was waived by the Bengals on August 31, 2012.

=== Edmonton Eskimos ===
The Roughriders traded O'Donnell's rights to the Edmonton Eskimos on September 5, 2012. He was officially signed by the Eskimos on September 17, 2012. He played for the Eskimos from 2012 to 2014.

=== Cincinnati Bengals (II) ===
O'Donnell was signed by the Cincinnati Bengals again on February 2, 2015. He was waived by the Bengals on September 5, 2015, after failing to make the 53-man final roster.

=== Edmonton Eskimos / Elks (II) ===
On September 9, 2015, O'Donnell re-signed with the Edmonton Eskimos. He played and started in eight regular season games and two post-season games, including his start at right guard in the Eskimos' 103rd Grey Cup win. O'Donnell re-signed with the Elks on June 24, 2021. He played in all 14 regular season games for the Elks in 2021. He announced his retirement on February 3, 2022.
