= Laura Waller =

Canadian-American computer scientist

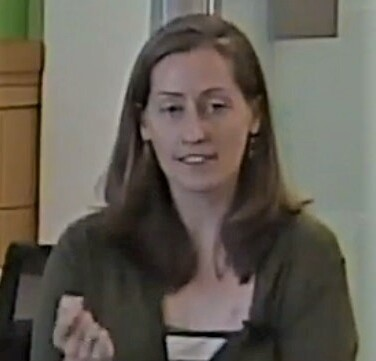
- Waller speaks at the Berkeley Institute for Data Science, Data, Society and Inference Seminar in 2015
- Born: Laura Ann Waller
- Education: Massachusetts Institute of Technology (BS, MEng, PhD)
- Awards: National Science Foundation CAREER Award; Adolph Lomb Medal (2021); Max Planck–Humboldt Medal (2024)
- Scientific career
- Workplaces: University of California, Berkeley; Berkeley Institute for Data Science; Princeton University; University of Cambridge
- Thesis: Computational phase imaging based on intensity transport (2010)
- Doctoral advisor: George Barbastathis
- Website: laurawaller.com

Laura Ann Waller is a Canadian-American computer scientist who holds the Charles A. Desoer Chair in Engineering at the University of California, Berkeley, where she directs the Computational Imaging Lab. Her research focuses on computational imaging, developing techniques that integrate optical hardware design with computational processing to advance microscopy and phase imaging. She is a Fellow of Optica (formerly The Optical Society) and the American Institute for Medical and Biological Engineering, and a senior fellow of the Berkeley Institute for Data Science.

== Early life and education ==
Waller grew up in Kingston, Ontario, where she attended Holy Cross Catholic Secondary School. She pursued all three of her degrees at the Massachusetts Institute of Technology, earning a bachelor's degree in Electronic Engineering and Computer Science in 2004 and a Master's degree in 2005. During her undergraduate studies, she spent a year at the University of Cambridge as part of the Cambridge–MIT Institute. Her Master's thesis examined the design of feedback loops and experimental testing techniques for integrated optics.

While at MIT, Waller was active in campus life: she played on the Women's Varsity soccer team, served as president of The Optical Society student chapter, and participated in the Singapore-MIT Alliance for Research and Technology (SMART) programme.

She completed her doctorate in 2010 under the supervision of George Barbastathis, with a thesis that developed new techniques to image phase and amplitude.

== Career and research ==
Following her doctorate, Waller joined Princeton University in 2010 as a research associate and lecturer. She moved to the University of California, Berkeley in 2012, where she was awarded tenure in 2016. Waller held the Ted Van Duzer Endowed Professorship from 2016 to 2020 and was subsequently appointed to the Charles A. Desoer Chair in Engineering.

Waller's research group specialises in computational imaging, an approach that integrates optical system design with computational processing. Their work spans phase imaging, super-resolution microscopy, and lensless imaging, with applications in both biomedical and industrial sciences. She has developed machine learning techniques for 3D microscopy and her group maintains open source software for imaging applications.

In 2014, she received both a David and Lucile Packard Foundation Fellowship and a Gordon and Betty Moore Foundation Data-Driven Discovery Investigator award. Her National Science Foundation CAREER Award supports her research group's work building computational and experimental software for imaging 4D partially spatially coherent light. In 2017, she was awarded an investigator award from the Chan Zuckerberg Initiative to develop microscopes capable of imaging deep structures within the brain.

Waller was recognised as one of the MIT EECS Rising Stars in 2018. In 2024, she was awarded the Max Planck–Humboldt Medal by the Max Planck Society and the Alexander von Humboldt Foundation, cited as a pioneer of computational microscopy for combining computer science and simple instruments to make additional detail visible and to produce three-dimensional images and videos.

== Awards and honours ==
- 2012 Ivan P. Kaminow Outstanding Early Career Professional Prize, The Optical Society
- 2016 Carol D. Soc Distinguished Graduate Student Mentoring Award for Junior Faculty
- 2016 Best Paper Award, International Conference on Computational Photography
- 2018 SPIE Early Career Achievement Award in Academia
- 2019 Fellow of The Optical Society (now Optica)
- 2019 Fellow of the American Institute for Medical and Biological Engineering, for pioneering contributions to computational microscopy methods enabling fast, high-content and 3D phase microscopy of biological samples and neural activity
- 2021 Adolph Lomb Medal, for important contributions to the advancement of computational microscopy and its applications
- 2024 Max Planck–Humboldt Medal, for pioneering contributions to computational microscopy
