= St. Theresa Catholic Secondary School =

St. Theresa C.S.S.
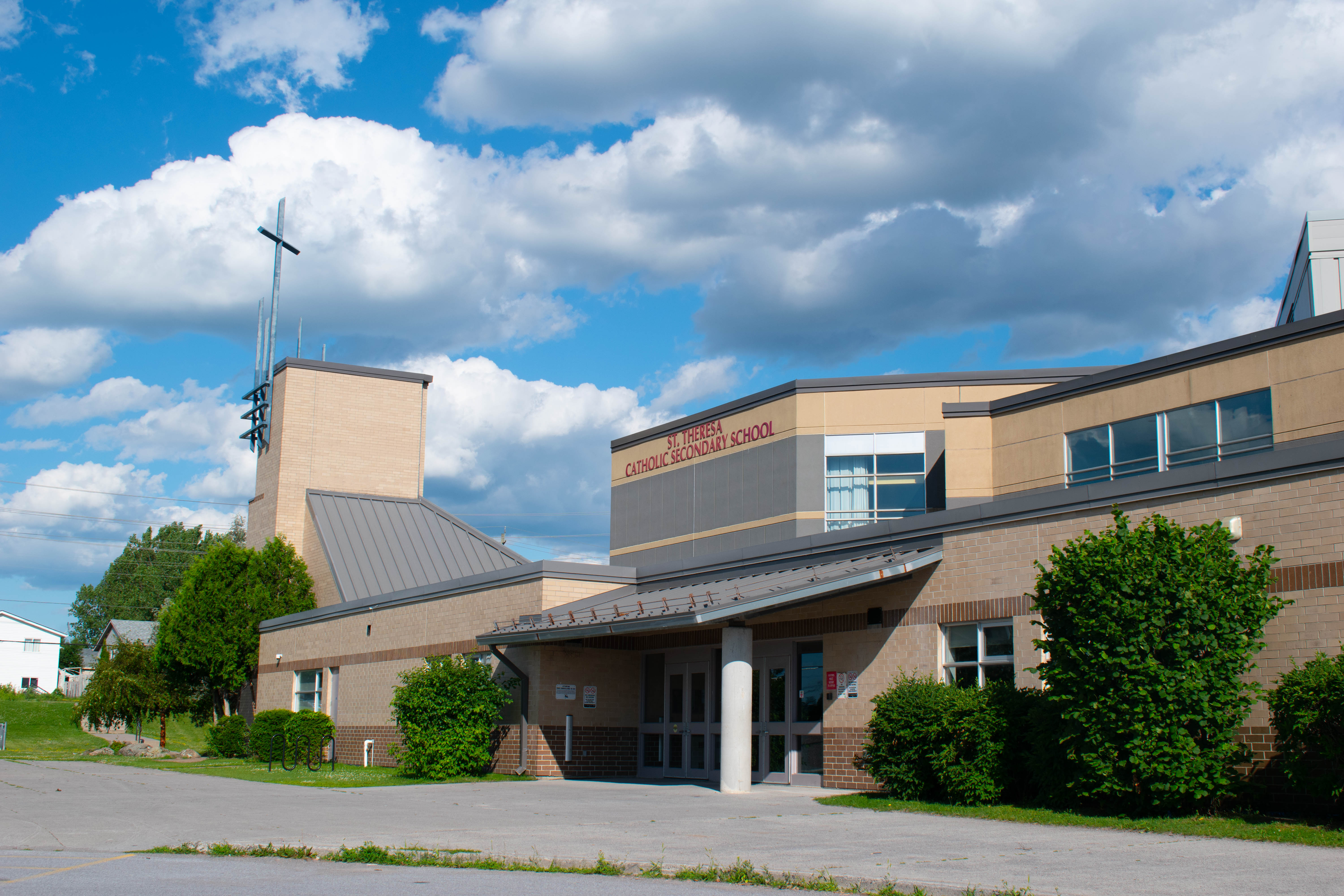

Location
- 135 Adam Street; Belleville, Ontario, K8N 5K3; Canada; 44.18836°N 77.37982°W

Information
- School type: Secondary
- Motto: Cura Et Audax Virtute (Care and Bold Power)
- Religious affiliation: Catholic
- Founded: 1998
- School board: Algonquin and Lakeshore Catholic District School Board
- Superintendent: Carey Smith-Dewey
- School number: 851752
- Principal: Lisa Romano
- Vice Principal: Steve Tracze
- Grades: 9-12
- Enrollment: around 750 (2023-2024)
- Language: English
- Colours: Navy Blue, White, Maroon
- Slogan: Once a Titan, always a Titan
- Team name: Titans
- Website: thss.alcdsb.on.ca

St. Theresa Catholic Secondary School (STCSS) is a Roman Catholic Secondary School in Belleville, Ontario, Canada. It operates under the direction of the Algonquin and Lakeshore Catholic District School Board. The school is named after the patron saint, St. Theresa (1873–1897). The school is a uniform institution serving grades 9 through 12.

== Administration ==
In 2024, there were over 70 teaching staff, over 20 support staff and two administrators, led by a principal and vice-principal.

== Academics ==
All students who attend St. Theresa are taught under the Ontario Secondary Curriculum. From 2002 to 2004, St. Theresa had success rates below 80%, but by the 2007 school year, the success rate had risen to 92%. This improvement followed a period of instructional development, where between 2002 and 2004, course failure rates initially exceeded 40% before dropping to 21.5% by 2006. concurrent with Ontario Secondary School Literacy Test (OSSLT) pass rates reaching 89.6%

Performance measured by the Fraser Institute has shown variability. In the 2011–2012 school year, St. Theresa scored 6.1/10, ranking it 378th out of the 725 Ontario secondary schools. This was the start of a decline from the school's peak performance, having ranked highest in the school board during the 2010–2011 school year with a score of 8.6/10. Despite this decline, St. Theresa's score was still above the provincial average at the time.

Following this, the school saw mixed results in academic performance. a rise to 6.7/10 in 2013, and a dip to 6.2/10 in 2014, with a bigger decline to 5.7/10 by 2015, which placed the school below the provincial average of 6.0. From 2011 to 2015, St. Theresa Catholic Secondary School's score fell by 2.9 points, marking an era of academic decline in the 2010s, with the school's score reaching even lower with 5.5/10 in 2016.

The 2017 school year resulted in a slight improvement for St. Theresa, the first increase in its ranking since 2013. It scored 5.6/10 and ranked 477th out of 747 Ontario secondary schools, still well below the provincial average of around 6.0. It retained its place as the lowest ranking secondary school in the Algonquin and Lakeshore Catholic District School Board, with the next lowest being Holy Cross Catholic Secondary School with 6.3/10. St. Theresa remained the only secondary school in the ALCDSB to rank below the provincial average.

The school's academic standing continued to decline through the late 2010s, with scores falling to 5.1/10 in 2018 (536th out of 738 schools) and reaching a new low of 3.6/10 by the 2019 school year (664th out of 739 schools), reaching its lowest point of the decade. The school had the lowest score of all secondary schools in the Algonquin and Lakeshore Catholic District School Board, with the next highest score being Holy Cross Catholic Secondary School, with a score of 5.9/10.

Recent years have indicated a period of recovery. In the 2022 report, St. Theresa saw its score climb back up to a 6.1/10 (357th out of 689 schools), falling back above the provincial average of 6.0. This upward slope has been continuing in its subsequent assessments, with a recorded 6.2/10 in 2024. Most recently, in the November 2025 report, the school earned a 6.7/10, ranking second among local secondary schools in the region.

== Facilities ==
St. Theresa is equipped with a wide range of athletic facilities. These include an upgraded workout facility, a newly resurfaced outdoor track, two soccer/rugby fields, and a gymnasium. The school property also includes a dedicated walkway to the Quinte Sports and Wellness Centre as well as the CAA Arena and Wally Dever Arena, which provides students with access to further sports facilities and supports the school's Canadian Hockey Skills Academy classes.

To accommodate the growing student population, a new wing was constructed and officially opened during the 2005 school year. This expansion included a new art studio, updated office spaces, and a dedicated life skills room.

St. Theresa also has several off-campus classrooms that it shares with Sir James Whitney School, where welding, mechanics, cosmetology and construction programs are taught.

== Athletics ==
St. Theresa Catholic Secondary School maintains an interscholastic athletics program affiliated with the Central Ontario Secondary Schools Association (COSSA) and the Ontario Federation of School Athletic Associations (OFSAA). Teams are organized by gender, grade level (junior for grades 9–10, senior for grades 11–12, and varsity), and season, with offerings contingent upon student interest and coaching availability. Participation requirements include enrollment in a minimum of three credit-bearing courses and adherence to OFSAA transfer policies.

St. Theresa Catholic Secondary School offers a range of sports for students, including curling, hockey, soccer, rugby, golf, swimming, alpine and downhill skiing, cross-country running, track and field, ultimate frisbee, basketball, baseball, volleyball, badminton, and tennis.

=== Hockey ===
Girls' Hockey Team

The St. Theresa Girls' hockey program has a history of success at the provincial level, highlighted by a streak of medaling at the OFSAA championships for six consecutive years. This period of dominance included capturing silver medals in 2010, 2011, and 2015, as well as a bronze medal in 2013 and an antique bronze in 2014. Other notable program highlights include a decisive 5–1 victory over Appleby College in 2012 and a strong showing in 2014, where the Titans swept all four games leading into the semi-finals of the OFSAA AA-division championship.

Boys' Hockey Team:

The boys' hockey program has consistently demonstrated regional and provincial excellence, beginning with a major 8–3 victory over Holy Cross Secondary School to secure the 2008 COSSA title. The program reached new heights in the 2024 season, where the Titans completed an unbeaten campaign, capturing both the Bay of Quinte and COSSA championships with a cumulative goal differential of 113–15. This momentum culminated in a historic 2026 season, the team won their first-ever OFSAA A/AA Gold Medal. Playing at the CAA Arena in Belleville, they finished an undefeated 18–0–1 season by defeating the Sydenham Golden Eagles in overtime, with Pierson Clute scoring the game-winning goal.

Beyond Hockey, The school actively participates in other COSSA and OFSAA championships across various sports, including soccer, basketball, and volleyball. Athletics at St. Theresa operate under the "Titans" identity, with a focus on competitive involvement and student achievement in regional interscholastic sports.

== Notable alumni ==
- Brad Richardson, American hockey player
- Cindy Nelles, Canadian rugby union player
- Hanna Bunton, former professional hockey player

== See also ==
- Education in Ontario
- List of secondary schools in Ontario
