= Stephen J. McCormick (radio correspondent) =

American radio correspondent

- Stephen J. McCormick, Mutual Broadcasting announcer, points to his own number as it is posted in the Selective Service Lottery while he was on the air. 1940
- Born: Stephen Joseph McCormick; May 4, 1914; Taunton, Bristol County, Massachusetts, US
- Died: November 30, 2011 (aged 97); Bar Harbor, Maine, US
- Education: Boston University
- Occupations: Announcer, correspondent, radio host
- Presenting career
- Show: The American Forum, Youth Wants To Know (both NBC-TV)
- Station: NBC-TV
- Style: radio interview moderator
- Country: United States

Stephen Joseph McCormick (1914–2011) was an American radio correspondent, working on the Mutual Broadcasting System (MBS, Mutual) since 1935, where he introduced "fireside chats" of president Franklin D. Roosevelt for Mutual audience.

== Biography ==
=== Early days ===
Stephen Joseph McCormick was born on May 4, 1914, in Taunton, a city in Bristol County, Massachusetts. His parents were Stephen J. and Mary Gaffney McCormick.

He was growing in Taunton and Cambridge, Massachusetts, and attended Boston University.

=== Mutual ===
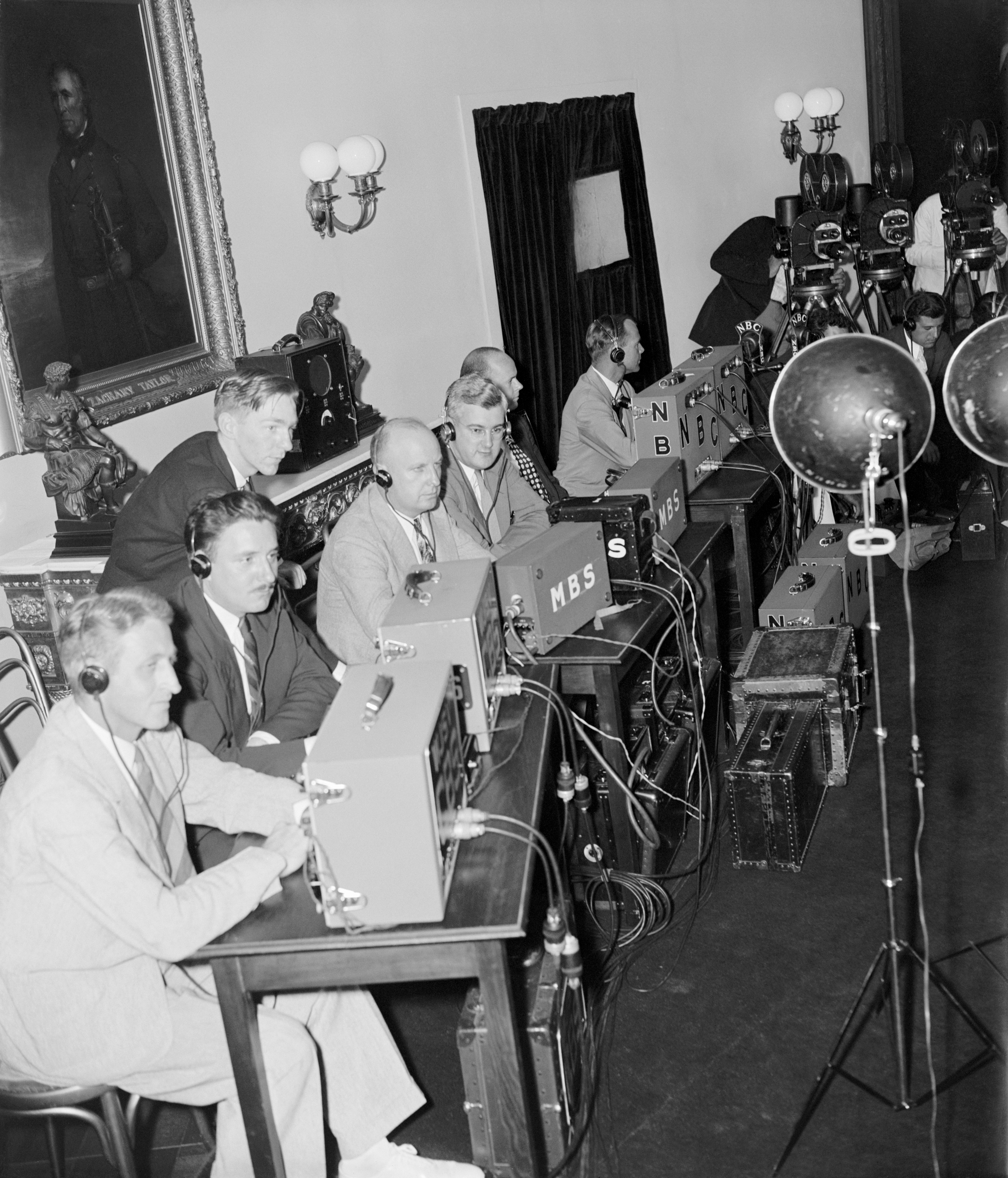
Radio stations broadcasting Franklin D. Roosevelt "fireside chats" at the White House, Washington, D.C. 1939

McCormick arrived in Washington, D.C., in the middle of the 1930s, where, after working for some time for a local radio station, joined Mutual in 1935.

McCormick became a top executive of Mutual.

=== NBC-TV ===
McCormick became a host of two shows on the NBC-TV in 1954, "The American Forum" and "Youth Wants To Know", where Stephen J. McCormick found his style as "neutral moderator", he explained that in the interview for the Washington Post in 1956: "The moderator must be neutral, ...no public affairs discussion program can last for very long if word gets around that the moderator favors one point of view. Guests will just refuse to take part in the show".

In "Youth Wants To Know", McCormick interviewed John F. Kennedy, who was that time Democratic Party Senator representing Massachusetts. McCormick asked John F. Kennedy if he consider to accept an offer be as a candidate on the vice president office, about that Kennedy answered: "I think it's a bad idea in politics and every other kind of job to accept or refuse things which have not and probably will not be offered to you,.. I suppose it's like saying to a girl, 'If I asked you to marry me, and I'm not asking you to marry me, would you marry me?' I suppose, when the time comes, we can make a better judgment on it." On what McCormick responded humorously: "I wouldn't be surprised, after reading about you for many years, Senator, if we had a lot of girls who were thinking of marrying you."

=== World War II ===
McCormick had a service in the Army in the Pacific during World War II and was awarded with the Bronze Star Medal for the Battle of Saipan.

=== Marriage ===
McCormick was on the air with Mutual broadcasting of the draft lottery (see photograph above), when his aid asked him what is his number, McCormick answered: "It's 105" — "Well, they just pulled your number out of the bowl. You're in the Army," — said his aid. Then McCormick served in the US Army and occurred in the Pacific Ocean during World War II.

During World War II, his future wife Theodora "Theo" McCormick was serving as an Armed Forces Radio Service (AFRS) host of the show "Red Cross Music Canteen of the Air" in the Saipan, they met first in Honolulu, then in Saipan, and married in December 1945.

=== Television career ===
He played, in the 1950s, himself as a correspondent, in "It Happened to Jane", a comedy with Doris Day and Jack Lemmon.

=== Again radio ===
McCormick returned to work on Mutual in Washington in the 1960s as a vice president, working as on news and interview until the 1970s. He was a producer and director of coverage of Project Gemini, Apollo program, Project Mercury for Mutual.

=== Death ===
Stephen J. McCormick died November 30, 2011, in the Bar Harbor, Maine, from congestive heart failure.
