= Steve McCormick (executive) =

(Former) CEO The Nature Conservancy and the Gordon and Betty Moore Foundation
- In office 2000–2014

Personal details
- Born: 1951 (age 74–75)
- Spouse: Kathryn
- Children: 2
- Education: UC Berkeley, University of California, Hastings College of the Law

Steve McCormick is the former president of The Gordon and Betty Moore Foundation (2007–2014) and the former president and CEO of The Nature Conservancy (2000–2007). In May 2014, Gordon Moore announced that McCormick was leaving the Moore Foundation to co-found a startup to create the first global, open-source database on ecosystem services and natural capital, called The Earth Genome. McCormick is a board member for many social impact and environmental organizations.

== The Nature Conservancy ==
McCormick is credited with reorganizing The Nature Conservancy (TNC) into a "truly global entity to fulfill its mission." During his tenure, the group grew to operate in 30 countries and all 50 states in the United States, with revenues in excess of $650 million, with its assets increasing to $5.4 billion. McCormick began his career with TNC in 1976 as western regional legal counsel. He then spent 16 years as executive director of California and Western Region. In 2004, he asked TNC's science staff to develop a framework to guide global conservation at the organization, which ultimately produced The Atlas of Global Conservation to collate environmental information He led the effort to create and incorporate the strategic framework that still guides the group's work, called Conservation by Design (see "Method" at The Nature Conservancy). On June 8, 2005, McCormick defended TNC's land acquisition practices in front of the United States Senate Committee on Finance, after a 2003 Washington Post article, Nonprofit Land Bank Amasses Millions, questioned TNC's motives. An academic study of the incident concluded that the Post's analysis was "reductionist" to the point of "misleading."

== The Moore Foundation ==
As president and CEO of the Moore Foundation, McCormick wrote prolifically on the importance of supporting basic science, especially for environmental conservation. McCormick oversaw more than $1 billion in grants, many of which were granted to scientific research, including $34.2 million to simulate experimental research in the physics of quantum materials and $12.5 million (joint with Sloan Foundation) to the Berkeley Institute for Data Science. McCormick left "abruptly" with much speculation as to why. It became clear in subsequent months that McCormick left to create a 501(c)(3) non-profit, The Earth Genome, to make environmental information more accessible, using best practices from the tech industry.

== Board service and awards ==
McCormick has served on numerous boards, including The Independent Sector, Sustainable Conservation, the California Academy of Sciences, and the advisory board of the UC Berkeley College of Natural Resources. He is the recipient of the Chevron Conservation Award; the Department of Interior Silver Award; and the Edmund G. Brown Award for Environmental and Economic Balance.
