= Holy Cross Catholic Secondary School =

Location
- 1085 Woodbine Road; Kingston, Ontario, K7P 2V9; Canada; 44°15′28″N 76°35′49″W

Information
- School type: Secondary
- Religious affiliation: Catholic
- Founded: 1986
- School board: Algonquin and Lakeshore Catholic District School Board
- Superintendent: Karen Shannon
- School number: 715298
- Principal: Anna Coe
- Grades: 9–12
- Enrollment: 1,125 (2020–21)
- Language: English
- Campus: Suburban
- Area: Bayridge (West Kingston)
- Colours: Green and Silver
- Team name: Crusaders (1986-2024) Saints (2024-present)
- Feeder schools: John XXIII Catholic School; Archbishop O'Sullivan Catholic School; Our Lady of Lourdes Catholic School; St. Marguerite Bourgeoys Catholic School; Mother Teresa Catholic School; St. Genveieve
- Website: hcss.alcdsb.on.ca

Holy Cross Catholic Secondary School (sometimes abbreviated to HC, or HCSS) is a Catholic secondary school located in Kingston, Ontario, Canada offering education for about 1,400 students in grades 9–12.

== History ==
The school was established in September 1986. It was fully public funded, along with other Catholic secondary schools who also were public funded from 1986 to 1987. The school occupied shared facilities with KCVI until September 1990 when a new $15 million campus was opened.

The school's team name was changed from Crusaders to Saints in 2024.

== Athletics ==
Holy Cross has a history of athletic success at the local, provincial and national levels. School alumni include NHL defenceman Jay McKee, olympic wrestler Paul Ragusa, and Canadian hockey star Jayna Hefford. In the past, the Holy Cross Football Team has dominated the sport, winning consecutive OFSAA titles in 2018 and 2019.

== Musicals ==
The annual musical and prominent theatre-arts program are a staple of student life at HC.

Year	Musical
1999	Little Shop of Horrors
2002	Guys and Dolls
2003	The Good Doctor*
2004	My Fair Lady
2005	Les Misérables
2006	A Midsummer Night's Dream*
2007	Urinetown
2008	The Crucible*
2009	West Side Story
2010	Pippin
2011	Phantom of the Opera
2012	The Secret Garden
2013	Jesus Christ Superstar
2014	Shrek the Musical
2015	Guys and Dolls
2016	Les Misérables
2017	Godspell
2018	Newsies
2019	Little Shop of Horrors
2020	n/a
2021	The Wizard of Oz (cancelled)
2022	Grease
2023	Mamma Mia
2024	Pippin
2025	School of Rock
2026	Sister Act

*play, not a musical

== Notable alumni ==
- Jay McKee, hockey player (Pittsburgh Penguins, NHL)
- Jayna Hefford, Canadian women's hockey gold medallist (Team Canada)
- Paul Ragusa, Canadian wrestler and olympic wrestling coach
- Nathan Robinson, hockey player (Espoo Blues, SM-liiga)
- Brent Johnson, football player (British Columbia Lions)
- Mike McCullough, football player (Saskatchewan Roughriders)
- Jamie Arniel, hockey player (Providence Bruins, AHL)
- Tim Cronk, football player (British Columbia Lions)
- Matt O'Donnell, football player (Cincinnati Bengals, Edmonton Eskimos)
- Shane Wright, hockey player (Seattle Kraken, NHL)
- Jason Robertson, hockey player (Dallas Stars, NHL)
- Andrew Peirson, football player (BC Lions, CFL)
- Hunter Drew, hockey player (Anaheim Ducks, NHL)
- Matt Villalta, hockey player (Utah Mammoth, NHL)
- Laura Waller, computer scientist (UC Berkeley)

== See also ==
- Education in Ontario
- List of secondary schools in Ontario
