= Berkeley Institute for Data Science =

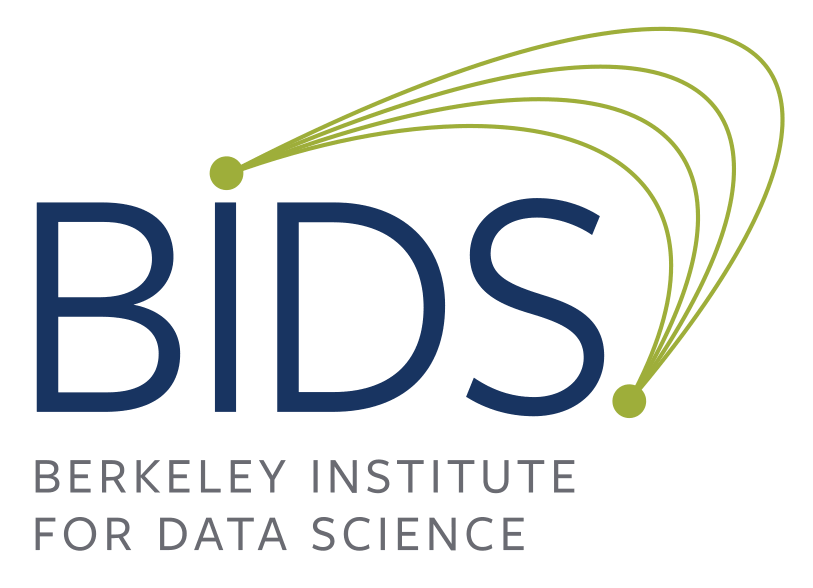
- Established: November 2013
- Faculty Director: Fernando Pérez
- Parent organization: University of California, Berkeley
- Website: bids.berkeley.edu

The Berkeley Institute for Data Science (BIDS) is a central hub of research and education within University of California, Berkeley designed to facilitate data-intensive science and earn grants to be disseminated within the sciences. BIDS was initially funded by grants from the Gordon and Betty Moore Foundation and the Sloan Foundation as part of a three-year grant with data science institutes at New York University and the University of Washington. The objective of the three-university initiative is to bring together domain experts from the natural and social sciences, along with methodological experts from computer science, statistics, and applied mathematics. Saul Perlmutter established BIDS in 2013 and stepped down as the Faculty Director in December 2023. The initiative was announced at a White House Office of Science and Technology Policy event to highlight and promote advances in data-driven scientific discovery, and is a core component of the National Science Foundation's strategic plan for building national capacity in data science.

== Working groups ==
When BIDS was founded in 2013, there were six working groups across the three universities included in the original Moore/Sloan grant, referred to as the Moore-Sloan Data Science Environments (MSDSE). The aim of the MSDSE was to address the major challenges facing advances in data-intensive research, including careers, education and training, tools and software, reproducibility and open science, physical and intellectual space, and data science studies. The efforts from these working groups led to the founding of the Academic Data Science Alliance (ADSA) in 2019. BIDS is a founding member of ADSA.

== Notable fellows ==
A primary objective of BIDS is to build a community of data science fellows and senior fellows across academic disciplines. The 23 current fellows constitute the majority of the onsite liveware at the Institute, which supports a number of notable initiatives (via Fellow support). The following list is a subset of notable fellows to date:

- Nick Adams, fellow, principal investigator of the Deciding Force project
- Fernando Pérez, senior fellow, creator of Jupyter and IPython
- Dan Hammer, fellow, Presidential Innovation Fellow and former Chief Data Scientist at the World Resources Institute
- Kathryn Huff, fellow, author of Effective Computation in Physics
- Leonard Apeltsin, Health Innovation Fellow, Head of Data Science at Anomaly, co-founder of Primer.ai and author of Data Science Bookcamp: Five Python Projects
- Stéfan Van Der Walt, computational fellow, author of scikit-image
- Laura Waller
