= Gabo Arora =

American filmmaker and creative technologist

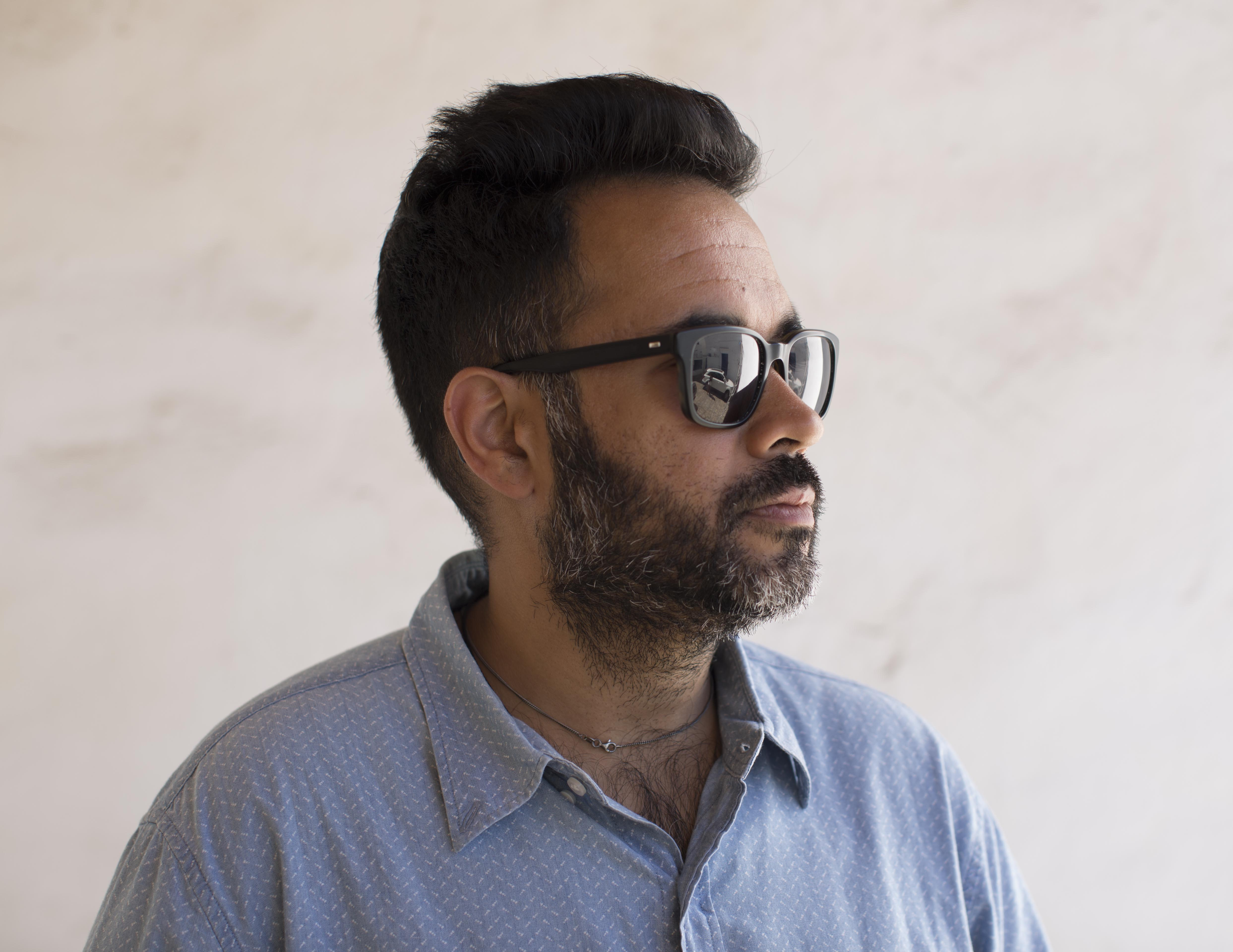
- Born: Queens, New York City, New York,
- Occupations: Professor, Immersive artist, Director, United Nations, Creative Technologist
- Employer(s): Johns Hopkins University, LIGHTSHED
- Known for: Virtual reality, Immersive art, Documentary
- Website: gaboarora.com

Gabo Arora is an American filmmaker, creative technologist and Founder/CEO of LIGHTSHED, a studio focusing on emerging technologies. He is a professor at Johns Hopkins University, where he is the Founding Director of the new Immersive Storytelling and Emerging Technology (ISET) program and lab. Formerly, he was a Senior Policy Advisor for Secretary General Ban Ki-moon and the UN's first Creative Director, with over 15 years of field experience. He has directed, produced and pioneered a series of virtual reality documentaries (Clouds Over Sidra, Waves of Grace, My Mother's Wing) for the United Nations that have premiered at film festivals, featured at the World Economic Forum in Davos, screened at the White House, and have exhibited at the Museum of Modern Art's inaugural program on immersive storytelling.

His VR experience, "The Last Goodbye", commissioned by Steven Spielberg's Shoah Foundation, premiered at the Tribeca Film Festival, with the LA Times calling it "game changing" and "transcending all the typical barriers of rectangular cinema."

A native New Yorker, Gabo also holds honors degrees with distinction from NYU and Johns Hopkins University. He is a Davos World Economic Forum Arts and Cultural leader and was nominated for a term-membership at the Council on Foreign Relations by Francis Fukuyama. His work has been nominated for an Emmy, awarded a Cannes Lions, a Sheffield Doc/Fest award for best documentary and has been featured in the New Yorker, the British Film Institute's Sight and Sound magazine, Fast Company, New York Times. He's been featured in the book The Fuzzy and the Techie by Scott Hartley and his work has been covered widely in the Guardian, Vice News, Wired, TED, NPR and PBS Newshour.

== VR/AR/AI Filmography ==
=== Clouds Over Sidra (2015) ===
Clouds Over Sidra is the story of Sidra, a 12-year-old girl who walked with her family across the desert fleeing escalating violence in Syria and settled at Zaatari refugee camp, a sprawling tent camp housing more than 80,000 Syrians in the remote Jordanian desert. Her family was hopeful at the time that they would be able to return home in short order when the crisis subsided. Instead, the conflict in Syria has proven intractable, and those who fled have been faced with the reality that it may be many more years, even decades, before it is safe to return home or until they are permanently settled. The UN estimates that in protracted refugee situations, the average displacement lasts 17 years.

==== Social impact ====
The 8 minute 360° VR piece Clouds Over Sidra inspired a worldwide "VR for good" movement. Through their "Empathy to Action" program, UNICEF volunteers took to the streets with VR headsets, sharing Clouds Over Sidra in 15 languages in over 40 countries. The response was overwhelming; One out of every six people who watched the film donated to relief efforts - twice the usual rate.

=== Waves of Grace (2015) ===
Liberia has endured the largest Ebola outbreak in history. As communities rebuild, one woman seeks healing through faith. In a Liberian hospital a young woman comforts a child infected with the Ebola virus. She doesn't wear a protective suit or mask. Waves of Grace is the story of Decontee Davis, an Ebola survivor who uses her immunity to care for orphaned children in her village. Waves of Grace was created by Gabo Arora and Chris Milk and was the second UN project by Here Be Dragons.

=== Ground Beneath Her (2016) ===
Ground Beneath Her is a virtual reality film that showcases the struggle of 14-year-old Sabita. More than a year after the Nepal earthquake, Sabita must balance the pain of picking up the pieces after the devastating quake and fulfilling the everyday duties of a fractured home, all while trying to keep her dreams for her future active.

=== My Mother's Wing (2016) ===
In Gaza, foundations are built, destroyed, and built again. My Mother's Wing is a short, immersive film produced by VR production company Vrse.works and developed in conjunction with the United Nations. The eight-minute documentary follows the daily life of a family in Gaza, after the loss of two sons in 2014 when Israel shelled UN Relief and Works Agency school shelters.

=== The Last Goodbye (2017) ===
The Last Goodbye is an immersive experience following Holocaust survivor Pinchas Gutter as he makes his final pilgrimage to Majdanek, a former Nazi extermination camp in occupied Poland. It debuted at the Tribeca Film Festival in 2017 and had its international premiere at the Venice Film Festival in September 2017. The 16-minute-long experience combines 360-degree video and photo realistic interactive environments one can walk through and interact with.

This virtual reality experience is a rare glimpse at history from the eyes of a man who lived it. Since 1943, Pinchas Gutter has repeatedly journeyed from his home in Toronto, Canada to Poland to share his experiences at Madjanek. Brought to the camp at age eleven, he has spent a lifetime educating teachers from all over the world on the horrors of last century. Gutter subjects himself to painful memories so that others might learn from his wisdom. Pinchas, now 85 years old, is both physically and emotionally exhausted. Unable to continue traversing the world, he has in recent years sought new methods of sharing his experiences. The Last Goodbye, co-created by Gabo Arora and Ari Palitz, is a co-production by the Shoah Foundation, Here Be Dragons, MPC VR and OTOY.

=== The Day The World Changed (2018) ===
The Day the World Changed is the first-ever interactive VR memorial experience to pay tribute to those effected directed by nuclear warfare spanning back to 1945. By utilizing testimonies from actual survivors and various data visualization, the 20-minute experience accurately showcases the devastating effects of atomic weaponry both physically and emotionally. Commissioned by the Nobel Peace Prize and developed in partnership with VR developer TomorrowNeverKnows and Nobel Media, the experience was screened at the Nobel Prize ceremony in Oslo, Norway.

=== Zikr: A Sufi Revival (2018) ===
Zikr: A Sufi Revival is an interactive social VR experience that uses music and dance to transport four participants into ecstatic Sufi rituals, while also exploring the role of this mystical Islamic tradition in the lives of devotees. Sufism is a commonly misunderstood and persecuted Islamic practice still observed by millions around the world.

Zikr: A Sufi Revival was picked at 2018 Sundance's New Frontier Festival and Dogwoof acquired worldwide distribution rights.

=== These Sleepless Nights (2019) ===
"These Sleepless Nights" lets viewers explore a 4-part mini-documentary with Magic Leap AR headsets by walking around a large cube. Each sides of the cubes helps them unlock part of the story, shining a light on the plight of people who have gone through the process of an eviction.

== Awards ==
- Sheffield docfest interactive award - Clouds Over Sidra
- Cannes lions Bronze - Waves of Grace
