= MRH =

MRH may refer to:

- MRH-90, Australian designation of NHIndustries NH90 helicopter
- Michael J. Smith Field, Beaufort, North Carolina, USA, airport IATA code

MRH may also stand for:

- March of Remembrance and Hope, a student program
- Montgomery Regional Hospital, later Lewis-Gale Hospital Montgomery, Blacksburg, Virginia, USA

mrh may refer to:

- Mara language (ISO 639-3 code)

== See also ==
- MRHS (disambiguation)
