= Liberation75 =

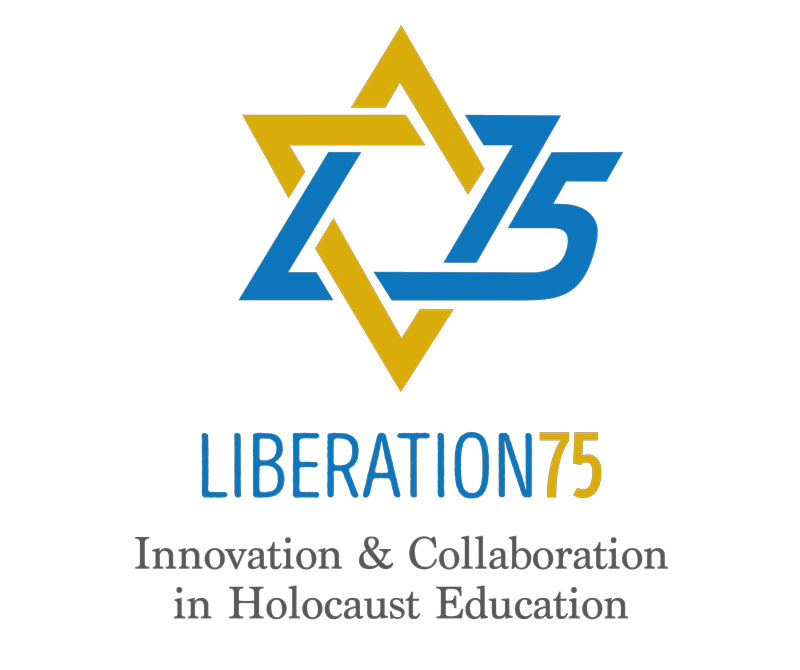
- Liberation75 logo. Designer: Ron Lebow
- Company type: Organization
- Genre: Holocaust Education
- Founded: 2018
- Founder: Marilyn Sinclair
- Headquarters: Toronto, Ontario

Liberation75 is a not-for-profit Holocaust education organization based in Toronto, Canada. It was initially founded to commemorate the 75th anniversary of the end of the Holocaust. The organization first gained recognition for organizing the largest Global Gathering of Holocaust Survivors, Descendants, Educators and Friends. Liberation75 also co-conducted a notable survey that assessed North American teenagers' Holocaust knowledge, thoughts, and related beliefs about antisemitism and the Holocaust, helping to change curriculum in Ontario, Canada. It was also known for its involvement in collecting testimonies of survivors who immigrated to Canada after WWII.

The Organization was founded in 2018 by Marilyn Sinclair, who aimed to fulfill a promise made to her late father, Ernie Weiss (1928-2010), to organize an event to bring survivors, descendants and students together.

== Background ==
Marilyn Sinclair, founder of Liberation75, was often awakened by the night terrors of her father, Ernie Weiss. Weiss, a Hungarian Holocaust survivor, later revealed that he had witnessed horrific atrocities committed by the Nazi regime, including being forced to watch the murder of many Jews while imprisoned in Auschwitz. Sinclair recalls, "When I was younger, it was hard to make sense of all of it; I would dream that I was in the camps." She explains that she experienced inherited memories, absorbing her father's stories and effectively becoming a witness herself as part of the “second generation (2G)” descendants of Holocaust survivors. "What happens when you're a child of someone who has endured such tremendous trauma is that those memories become yours," she explains. Sinclair's commitment to Holocaust education began in her childhood.

=== Holocaust survivor gatherings and conferences ===
In the 1980s, three significant conferences were organized which brought together Holocaust survivors and descendants for the first time. The first was the International Conference on the Holocaust and Genocide in Tel Aviv, Israel, during the summer of 1982. The second was the American Gathering of Holocaust Survivors in Washington, DC in 1983. In 1985, Sinclair and her father attended the Canadian Gathering of Holocaust Survivors and Descendants in Ottawa, Canada, with another 5,000 survivors and their families. During this event, Sinclair connected with her father and listened to his experiences of the Holocaust. Her observations were particularly influential when she witnessed other survivors and their children unite, interact, and share their testimonies.

This Ottawa gathering was significant because it was where Sinclair's father recounted his Holocaust experiences with her for the first time. Only a few such gatherings occurred, and all during the 1980s (see Further Information tab). It was at this event that Sinclair promised her father she would organize another gathering to bring Holocaust survivors and their children together, planting the initial seed for Liberation75.

== Liberation75: A global gathering ==
Liberation75: A Global Gathering of Holocaust Survivors, Descendants, Educators and Friends was initially slated for May 30-June 2, 2020, at the Metro Toronto Convention Centre, to commemorate 75 years since the liberation from the Holocaust. Before the onset of the COVID-19 pandemic, registration had exceeded 10,000 attendees. However, as the coronavirus pandemic escalated worldwide, the event had to be postponed.

In 2021, the event was reorganized for a free virtual audience and occurred online from May 4–9, with a Holocaust film festival from May 6–15. More than 55,000 people attended the event. Liberation75 hosted what it described as "the world's largest virtual gathering of Holocaust Survivors, Descendants, Educators, and Friends."

Liberation75's founder, Marilyn Sinclair, posed a question toward the global community: "How are we going to keep the memory and lessons of the Holocaust relevant for the future, particularly in the absence of survivors, who have done the vital work of sharing their stories, visiting schools, and establishing monuments and memorial centres?" Sinclair stated, "The five-day event focuses on what happens when hate goes unchecked," Sinclair told Canadian Jewish News.

There were 124 speakers and survivors who shared their stories. Some guest speakers included Elisha Wiesel, the son of Nobel laureate, Elie Wiesel, Dr. Ruth Westheimer, Dr. Deborah Lipstadt, and Justice Rosalie Abella. The conference included programming for descendants of Holocaust survivors, and virtual exhibits from the USC Shoah Foundation and Anne Frank House. New technologies were showcased such as the USC Shoah Foundation's Dimensions in Testimony.

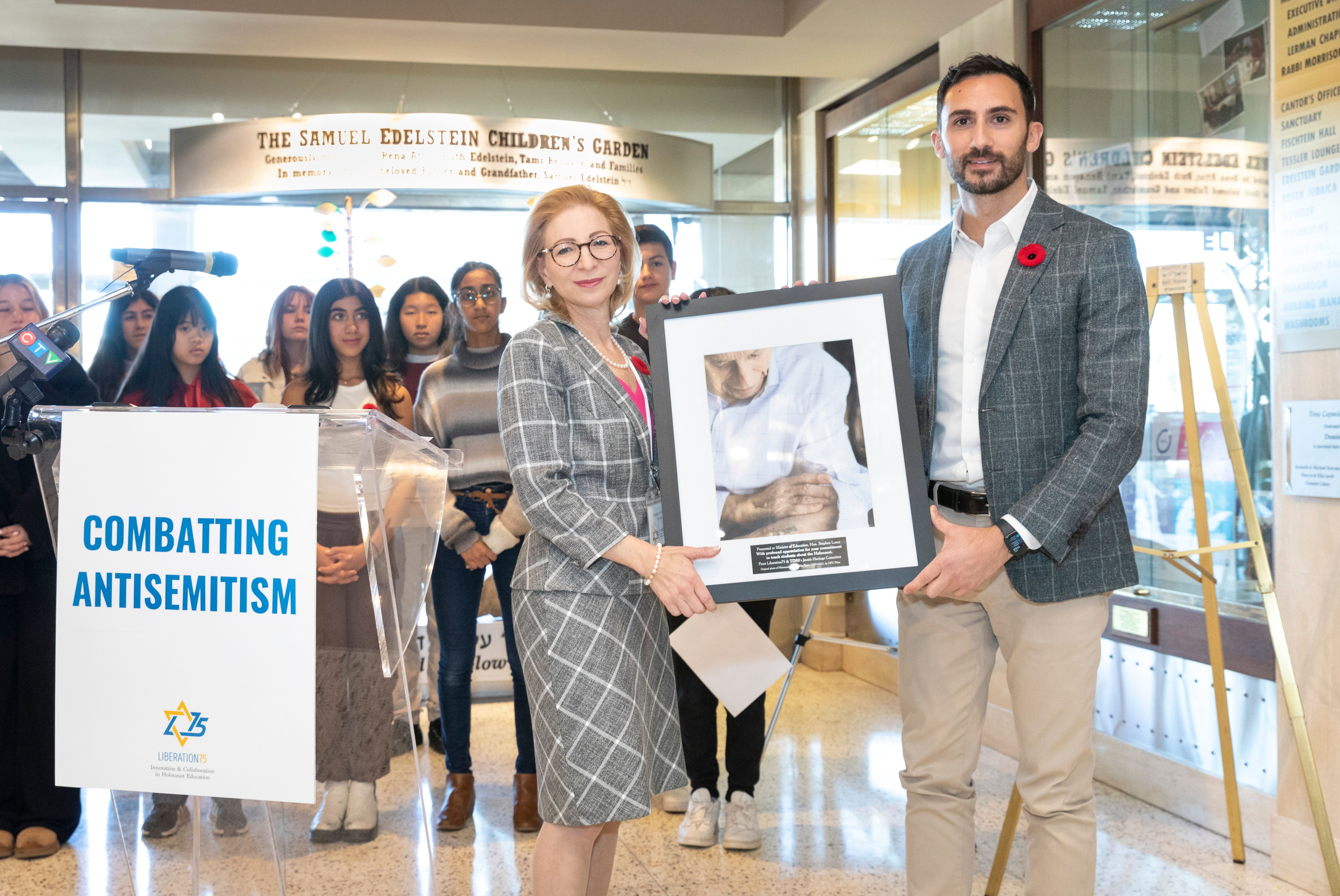
Founder Marilyn Sinclair presented a gift of appreciation to Ontario Education Minister Stephen Lecce at the announcement of mandatory Holocaust education in grade 6. The gift features a photo of Holocaust survivor Max Eisen.

== Significant surveys ==
=== 2021 Survey of North American Teens on the Holocaust and Antisemitism ===
In 2021, Liberation75 co-conducted a notable survey that assessed 3,593 students from Canada and the U.S. on their Holocaust knowledge, thoughts, and related beliefs about antisemitism. The key findings were that approximately one-third believed the Holocaust was exaggerated, fabricated, or were unsure, and over 40% reported witnessing antisemitic incidents. These results prompted Ontario Minister of Education, Stephen Lecce, to mandate Holocaust education in Grade 6 starting in 2023 (later for grade 10), the first such requirement in Canada. Other provinces, including British Columbia, Alberta, Manitoba, Saskatchewan, and Yukon, followed suit by 2025.

=== 2024 Survey of Ontario Grade 6 Students on the Holocaust and Antisemitism ===
The 2024 Survey of Ontario Grade 6 Students on the Holocaust and Antisemitism aimed to assess the impact of the Holocaust education curriculum introduced in 2023, starting with a pre-treatment survey which was conducted with 11,000 grade 6 students. The survey concluded that 67% of grade 6 students on Ontario believe that the Holocaust could happen again. In June 2024, over 5,000 Grade 6 students who took part in Liberation75's educational program completed a follow-up survey. The results revealed "major improvements" in students’ understanding of the Holocaust, with 81%, up from 67%, recognizing that the Holocaust occurred and that six million Jewish people were killed. Key findings:

- 66% of students said Jewish people experience antisemitism a lot or sometimes in Ontario.
- 56% of students said that when antisemitism happens in Ontario it is a big problem that needs urgent attention.
- 29% of students said Canada should be doing more to combat hate today.
- 29% of students said they wanted to fight antisemitism in Canada.
- 92% students recommended that other grade 6 students should read To Hope and Back: The Journey of the St. Louis by Kathy Kacer.

Liberation75 founder, Marilyn Sinclair, said, "We learned a lot from this study. Grade 6 students know what Jews are - even though 74% are not sure they have ever met a Jewish person. They see antisemitism and they believe it is an urgent problem. They want to learn about the Holocaust and 92% recommend that other students learn about it too. They want to fight antisemitism and think Canada should do more to fight it too."

== Creating a new curriculum in Canadian schools ==
Liberation75 has been instrumental in developing and supporting Holocaust education. In 2021, Liberation75 collaborated with educators, historians, survivors, and community leaders to assess gaps in existing educational frameworks. The organization conducted large-scale surveys (see: Significant Surveys above) and public consultations to better understand student knowledge levels and public attitudes. These findings helped Liberation75 advocate with the Ontario Ministry of Education for mandatory Holocaust education.

In 2022, during Holocaust Education Week, the Minister of Education announced that Holocaust education would be mandatory in elementary schools across the province of Ontario, starting in Grade 6, as a response to rising antisemitism in schools. Liberation75’s survey that was conducted in 2021 by Dr. Alexis Lerner from Western University, found that 1 in 3 students questioned whether the Holocaust even happened, or thought it was either fabricated or exaggerated. In an interview with Sinclair, it was discussed that Jews represent only 1% of the population in Canada, however, 360 out of 900 students had witnessed an antisemitic event.

The new curriculum was launched in the 2023–2024 academic year. In November 2024, The Ontario government announced an investment of $551,000 to expand Holocaust learning resources, including $140,000 to Liberation75 for developing classroom materials, lesson plans, and workshops aimed at combating racism and antisemitism in schools across the province.

Liberation75 has also provided educational support, workshops, resources and learning events for students and educators. With the objective to provide “innovation and collaboration in Holocaust education”, Liberation75 has partnered with global Holocaust organizations to bring more education to Canadian students.

=== The Willesden Project ===
The Willesden Project is a global Holocaust education initiative that combines music, storytelling, and survivor testimony to engage students in learning about the Holocaust and combating antisemitism. Liberation75 introduced The Willesden Project in partnership with the Toronto District School Board in the 2022/23 academic year. Through live performances for 4000 students that were simultaneously streamed across the school board, the program reached approximately 25,000 students, with 12,000 books distributed to students. The project includes a range of educational resources for different age groups, such as curriculum-aligned classroom materials, online training modules for educators, and technology-based learning tools. It was originally developed in a collaboration between USC Shoah Foundation and the Hold On To Your Music Foundation. The program has been adopted in countries such as the United States, the United Kingdom, and South Africa, highlighting its flexibility and international relevance in Holocaust education.

== Collaborative work ==
=== Virtual Holocaust Library ===
Liberation75's Virtual Holocaust Library is an online repository offering free access to a wide array of Holocaust-related educational materials. It features films, lectures, and programs sourced from prominent Holocaust institutions and educators around the world. The library is intended to support educators, students, and the public in learning about the Holocaust and addressing antisemitism. The Virtual Holocaust Library has received some global recognition. It has been endorsed by the German Federal Foreign Office for its role in addressing growing antisemitism and fostering Holocaust education. Moreover, school systems such as the Toronto District School Board have adopted the library as part of their educational materials on the Holocaust.

The library offers more than 320 programs, featuring survivor stories, educational documentaries, and talks led by experts, all designed to give a well-rounded understanding of the Holocaust. The organization has collaborated with more than 250 organizations around the world to curate and showcase content, offering a wide selection of resources. The content is offered in multiple languages in their inclusion efforts.

=== Last Chance Collection ===
As part of The Last Chance Collection, Liberation75 was tasked by the USC Shoah Foundation to identify and take video testimony from 150 Holocaust survivors who had immigrated to Canada after the war in English, French and Russian. The USC Shoah Foundation has recorded more than 56,000 testimonies since 1994. With help from volunteers and organizations across Canada, Liberation75 met their mandate.

=== Stories are Stronger than Hate: A Call to Action ===
Liberation75, in partnership with the USC Shoah Foundation, developed two virtual educational programs titled Stories are Stronger Than Hate: A Call to Action and Stories are Stronger Than Hate: A Call to Action 2.0. These initiatives were designed to educate students across Canada about the Holocaust, antisemitism, and racism, with the goal of fostering empathy and encouraging active opposition to hate. The two programs bridged historical events with contemporary issues, aiming to inspire a new generation to stand against hatred and promote social justice.

With the goal of helping students "to connect those dots between what they’ve been learning all year [about the Holocaust] to what’s happening in their communities right now,” the two organizations teamed-up to host an educational virtual broadcast to approximately 15,000 students, titled, "Stories are Stronger than Hate: A Call to Action," during the COVID-19 pandemic. The broadcast was hosted by Dr. Stephen D. Smith, Canadian director/actor, Mike Myers, with former NHL Hockey player Akim Aliu, who discussed confronting racism in professional sports, and Toronto Holocaust educator, survivor, and Order of Canada Appointee, Pinchas Gutter OC, sharing his personal story and experiences from concentration camps during the Holocaust (Madjanek, Buchenwald, and Theresienstadt).

“I have an obligation to speak out against racism and institutionalized hatred and that’s why I’m here...Now more than ever, it’s important to hear from survivors and witnesses of genocide, who know firsthand what can happen when hate goes unchecked. We all must remember and learn from history and do better for future generations,” remarked Mike Myers. Founder of Liberation75, Marilyn Sinclair, stated that when these personal accounts of the Holocaust are shared, students can draw parallels from their own lives, creating fellowship and awareness.

=== Stronger Than Hate: A Call to Action 2.0 ===
In 2021, as part of Black Heritage Month, Liberation75 launched a follow-up broadcast to its original program—marking the first joint initiative between Jewish and Black heritage committees from two separate school boards. The event featured Holocaust survivor Max Eisen alongside descendants of the 761st Tank Battalion, a segregated African American unit of the U.S. Army that played a role in liberating Nazi concentration camps. By highlighting the parallel histories of oppression and resilience within both communities, the program encouraged students to reflect on the ongoing struggle against hatred and discrimination. Student co-hosts shared they had been watching the rise of anti-black racism and antisemitism happening worldwide, and being home during the COVID-19 pandemic, had been spending their time enhancing their knowledge of black history, specifically the 761st Battalion and its impact on future generations. More than 150,000 students joined the virtual event from across Canada.

Ernie's Books Initiative

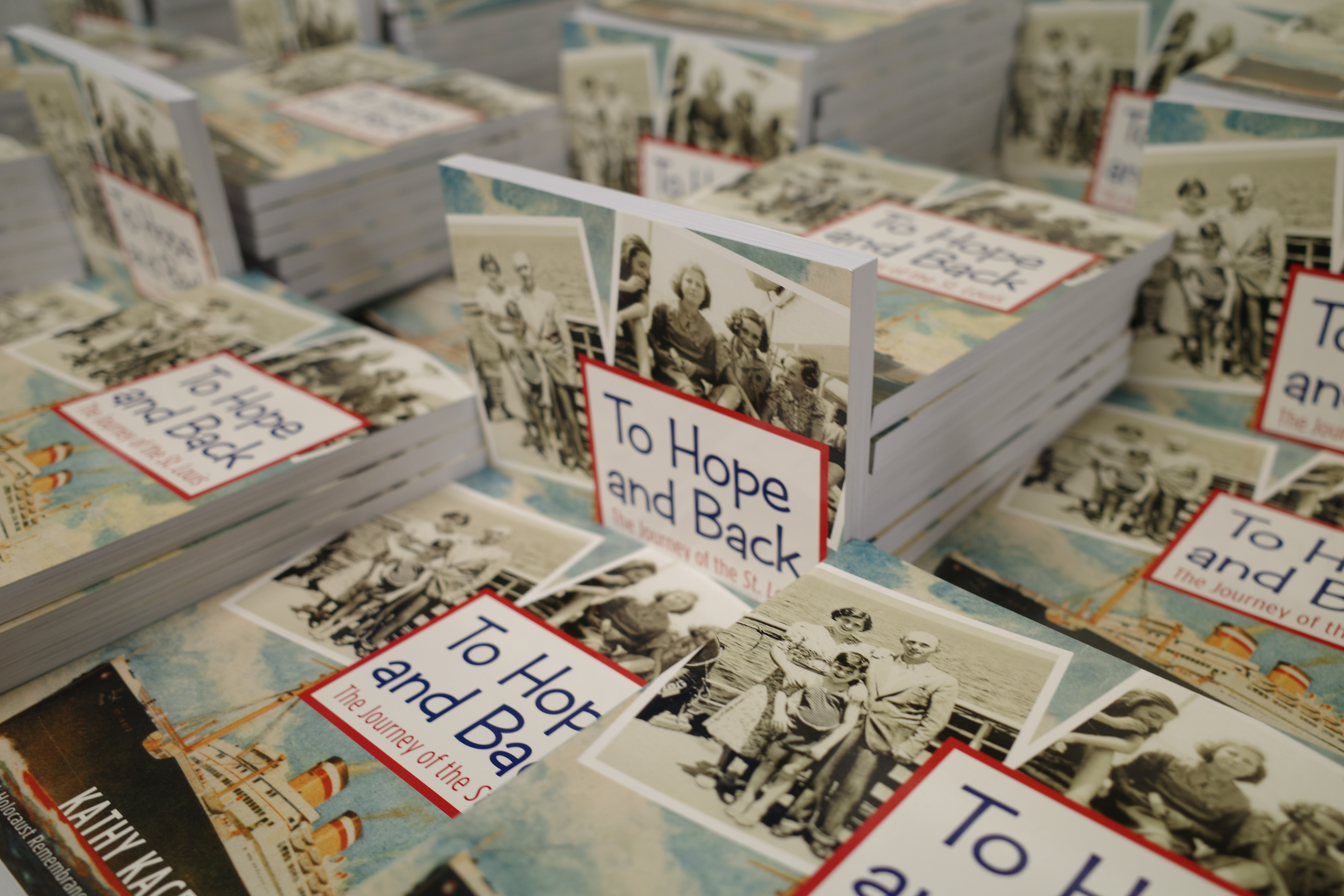
More than 80,000 copies provided free to grade 6 classrooms across Ontario.

In an effort to support the new curriculum for mandatory Holocaust education in grade 6 schools, Liberation75 launched its Ernie's Books initiative (named for the late Holocaust survivor, Ernie Weiss) in 2023. Since then, this initiative has provided more than 100,000 free books and complementary posters, teacher PD and educational resources to every school board across the province. "Teachers have a lot to teach in the curriculum. We want to make it as easy and as pleasant for them as possible," said Sinclair in an interview with the CBC.

== See also ==
- USC Shoah Foundation
- The Holocaust
- Witness: Passing the Torch of Holocaust Memory to New Generations
