= March of Remembrance and Hope =

International Holocaust education program

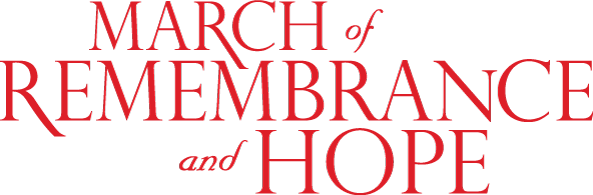

The March of Remembrance and Hope (MRH) is an international Holocaust education program for university and college students from diverse religious, cultural, and ethnic backgrounds. Founded in 2001 by Dr. David Machlis of the United States and Eli Rubenstein and Carla Wittes of Canada, the program focuses on teaching the history of the Holocaust and other genocides through experiential learning in Germany and Poland. The program is intended to foster awareness of intolerance and discrimination while encouraging dialogue among students from different communities.

== History and Founding ==
MRH was established in 2001 by Dr. David Machlis and Eli Rubenstein (both of whom worked with March of the Living), and Carla Wittes. Their goal was to adapt aspects of the March of the Living experiential model, with a focus on survivor testimony and on-site historical education into a program aimed at university students of varied backgrounds. The first MRH program was held in May 2001 with 400 participants representing twenty countries. In 2003 and 2006, a similar number of students participated, with students emanating from the US, Canada, Germany, Austria, Scandinavia, Rwanda, South Africa and China taking part in the program.

The program was run internationally from 2001 to 2006, and then in Canada from 2007 until 2023. The COVID-19 pandemic resulted in the program's cancellation from 2020 to 2022. The last program took place in 2023.

From 2007 to 2011, the program was operated annually in Canada for Canadian university students by the Canadian Centre for Diversity, in cooperation with partner organizations. In 2013, the Canadian Centre for Diversity transferred responsibility for the program to March of the Living Canada. The Canadian program was initially funded by the Azrieli Foundation, a philanthropic organization founded by Holocaust survivor David Azrieli, which supports a range of initiatives, including Holocaust education and commemoration. Other Canadian Jewish Foundations and philanthropists later began funding the program as well, including the Scotiabank Foundation, the Ben & Hilda Katz Foundation, the Gerald Schwartz, Honey and Barry Sherman & Heather Reisman Foundation, the Larry & Judy Tanenbaum Foundation, the Ira Gluskin & Maxine Granovsky Gluskin Foundation and Holocaust survivor, philanthropist, and past MRH participant, Joseph Gottdenker.

When the international MRH program ended in 2006, Nazareth College and Hobart and William Smith Colleges located in upstate NY (Rochester and Geneva, respectively) joined the Canadian delegation in 2008. In 2010, Nazareth College and Hobart and William Smith Colleges launched a related initiative titled The March: Bearing Witness to Hope which now runs biannually . An Austrian program with the same name also operates independently, traveling to Poland earlier in the year during the March of the Living.

== Program Structure ==
In its early years, the MRH program started with a full-day orientation in the New York area for North American participants before they travelled to Poland. The itinerary included visits to major Holocaust-related sites, such as former Jewish cultural centres in Warsaw, Kraków, and Lublin, as well as the extermination camps of Auschwitz-Birkenau, Treblinka and Majdanek. The Canadian MRH program developed a 3-month preparatory pre-trip curriculum, delivered via webinars, films, readings and group discussions; expanded the orientation to 2 days in Toronto; and added a 2-day visit to Berlin (including the site of the Wannsee Conference) at the start of the overseas trip.

Participants learn about the historical impact of these places and confront the consequences of hatred, indifference, and genocide. A key element of the program is the presence of Holocaust survivors, who accompany the group, share their testimonies, and provide context for what is being witnessed. Throughout the journey, students are encouraged to reflect on their experiences, engage in open discussion, and the goal of building meaningful connections across diverse backgrounds, fostering mutual understanding and highlighting the human capacity for resilience and reconciliation.

The itinerary typically includes meetings with Holocaust survivors before and during the trip, along with individuals recognized as Righteous Among the Nations, who discuss rescue efforts during Nazi rule. The importance of students meeting individuals recognized as Righteous Among the Nations reinforces ethical lessons of moral courage, altruism, and resistance to tyranny.

As it became less possible to meet with Righteous Among the Nations due to age and health, MRH pivoted to introduce participants to The Forum for Dialogue who work in communities throughout Poland to honour the memory of the former Jewish communities, learn about their history before and during the Holocaust, and preserve sites and cultural practices that were once part of their shared life experience.

While similar to the March of the Living in some respects, the March of Remembrance and Hope is a distinct program in many important ways. The March of the Living brings high school students, the majority Jewish, to Auschwitz -Birkenau on Holocaust Remembrance Day, to march in memory of all victims of Nazi genocide and against prejudice, intolerance, and hate. Some groups travel to Israel after their experience in Poland.

The March of Remembrance and Hope takes place later in the year, is aimed at university students, and is not tied to Holocaust Remembrance Day or an international March. As noted in the book Witness: Passing the Torch of Holocaust Memory to New Generations (Page 4): “The March of Remembrance and Hope is aimed at university students of all religions and backgrounds. Its purpose is to teach about the dangers of intolerance through the study of the Holocaust and other WWII genocides. The trip includes a short visit to Germany, followed by a longer visit to Poland, including many of the same sites as March of the Living. On both programs, Holocaust survivors share the memory of their wartime experiences with the young people in the very places where they unfolded."

== Educational Objectives ==
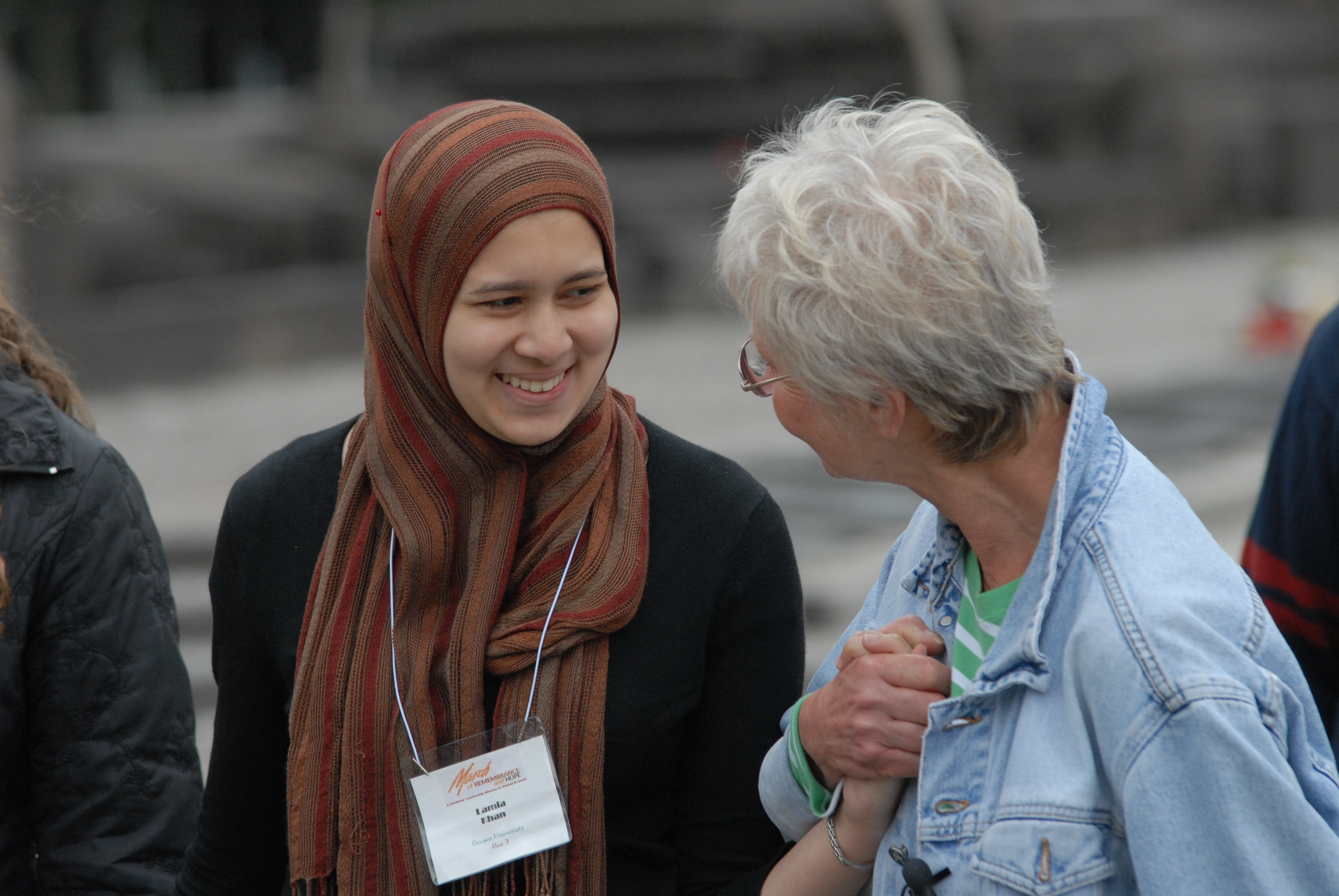
Credit: Yossi Zeliger

The program is designed to teach students from various religious and ethnic backgrounds about the historical events of the Holocaust and other genocides during WWII, along with the dangers of racism, antisemitism, hate, and intolerance, and to open a dialogue discussing the importance of intercultural understanding and promoting better relations among people. The trip itself is meant to be inclusive, open to Jews and non-Jews, exposing students to the stories of Holocaust survivors in the places their experience unfolded. Students have the opportunity to speak with survivors throughout the trip, ask questions, and listen to their experiences during WWII and the Holocaust. Students spend a few months preparing for the trip by studying various educational materials related to the itinerary. Students from a wide range of religious, ethnic, and cultural communities have participated in MRH, including Buddhist, Christian, Hindu, Jewish, Muslim, and Seventh-day Adventist students. Participants have also included individuals from communities with their own histories of persecution, such as survivors of the Rwandan genocide, First Nations students, Vietnamese Boat People, members of the Bahai community, and African American students.

Upon completion of the trip, students are encouraged to be take part in active efforts using their learned knowledge of the effects of antisemitism, hate speech throughout history, confront Holocaust denial and intolerance to help educate their community of peers and get involved on campus with initiatives promoting hope.

An important element of the program has been for students to reflect on their own personal family backgrounds of persecution and discrimination and examine parallels and distinctions with the Holocaust. Students with their own history of genocide or persecution, such as First Nations students or survivors of the Rwandan and Darfur genocides, have listened to the stories of survivors and drawn comfort and inspiration from their resilience and courage.

On January 27, 2007, International Holocaust Remembrance Day, Marie Mirlande Noel addressed the United Nations:

I challenge you, as I challenge myself, to be a beacon of change and to dare to question any inhumane treatment of others. I know that we cannot take care of all the world’s injustices, but I urge you to at least identify one step that you can take toward making a positive difference, however small. This is how change begins.

=== Goals ===
The program's goals gravitate around confronting antisemitism and all forms of discrimination, affirming the equal dignity of every human being, and learning from both the courage of Holocaust survivors and the moral example of the Righteous Among the Nations. Participants are encouraged to remember the victims, honour survivors and WWII liberators, and appreciate the diverse backgrounds of those taking part. The goals also emphasize personal responsibility: fostering a commitment to justice, tolerance, and community engagement. Ultimately, by visiting the historical sites in Poland, participants symbolically enter history itself, ensuring that the memory of the millions murdered in the Holocaust and World War II remains preserved and never forgotten.

== Holocaust Survivors Who Participated in MRH ==
Holocaust Survivors who took part in the MRH program include Steve Berger, Halina Birnbaum, Maud Dahme, Joseph Gottdenker, Elly Gotz, Nate Leipciger, Sylvia Ruth Gutmann, Pinchas Gutter, Roselyn Kirkel, Fred Spiegel, Faigie Libman, Fred Margulies, Irving Roth (z’l), Henry Sattler (z’l) Judith Steel (z'l), Sally Wasserman, Martin Weiss (z'l), and Gershon Willinger.

== MRH Films ==
7 Days of Remembrance and Hope (2009) aired on CBC's documentary channel and followed the journey of 60 Canadian university students of diverse backgrounds on the 2009 March of Remembrance and Hope. The film, directed by Fern Levitt, won Best Documentary at the Chicago International Film Festival.

Healing Voices (2009) is a documentary directed by Riva Finkelstein that follows a group of Holocaust survivors, many living in Canada, as they share their personal stories publicly with students and communities. Survivors in the film also participated in MRH

- Pinchas Gutter speaks at MRH 2007
- Testimony of Survivor Sally Wasserman at Auschwitz Birkenau - MRH 2008
- 2013 March of Remembrance and Hope
- Hope is Found in Those Willing to Listen (2016)
- Healing the World - March of Remembrance and Hope 2018
- March of Remembrance and Hope 2019: Seeing The Beauty In The Darkness
- March of Remembrance & Hope 2023- Footprints In My Heart

== Quotes from MRH ==
The following quotes were expressed by participants in the March of Remembrance and Hope and appear in WITNESS: Passing the Torch of Holocaust Memory to New Generations.

Be careful who you believe. Be careful who you follow. If you think that one politician suddenly has all the answers to all the questions in the world, be careful. Listen to someone else, because you are being hypnotized. That’s the message.

— Elly Gotz, Holocaust survivor and educator

We had a person named Moses on our trip, a survivor of the genocide in Rwanda. It was incredible how he bonded with me, by my being able to tell my stories. He wrote a letter about how it’s much easier for him to accept, to live in the future, because I have given him another Weltanschauung, another worldview. It’s very important for Holocaust survivors – or anybody else – to spread togetherness and goodwill, and I think it’s the young people specifically who can create this. Because drop by drop by drop, like water on a stone, the world can become a better place.

— Pinchas Gutter, Holocaust survivor and educator

When a survivor of the Holocaust holds hands with a Rwandan student in Auschwitz, and when they dry each other’s tears and learn from one another, we know that Hitler and tyrants like him can be defeated.

— Juliet Karugahe, Survivor of the Rwandan Genocide

== Jenn Casey Scholarship Fund ==
Captain Jenn Casey, a member of the Royal Canadian Armed Forces (RCAF), died on May 17, 2020, in an accident involving a Royal Canadian Air Force (RCAF) CT-114 Tutor aircraft near Kamloops British Columbia. Jenn Casey, a native of Halifax, N.S., was an alumna of the 2007 MRH program, and subsequent to her passing an MRH scholarship was set up in her name at the Toronto Holocaust Museum.

In the three years following her death, several commemorative initiatives were established in Casey's memory. The University of King's College in Halifax, where she was an alumna, created the Captain Jenn Casey Memorial Journalism Bursary. The March of Remembrance and Hope launched the Captain Jennifer Rose Casey Fund, and the City of Kamloops initiated plans for a memorial at Fulton Field Park to honour her legacy.

Jenn left a mark on everyone on the trip. Even if many lost contact as the years passed, they still followed her career. Jenn’s light continued to shine in so many ways. She was a driving force behind Operation Inspiration. This light was the hope of the survivors, Judy Cohen and Pinchas Gutter, who accompanied us on our trip. They believed that WE could continue to shine a light on their experiences. That the group could fight back against those spreading hate and disinformation. That we would continue the legacy of “Never Forget”. From darkness comes light. While we mourn the loss of Jenn, this scholarship aims to keep her light shining. This scholarship will allow others to be the light.

— MRH 2007 Cohort, Reflections on Jennifer Rose Casey

== Reunion on Christian Island ==
March of Remembrance and Hope held several reunions on Christian Island, home to the Beausoleil First Nation. Some program participants had First Nations heritage and were from Christian Island and nearby communities.

During the reunions, students heard from First Nations elders and educators and examined Canada's historical treatment of First Nations communities following colonization. Discussions also focused on applying insights from the program to better understand contemporary issues facing First Nations in Canada.

Trisha Lynn Cowie, a Liberal candidate for the riding of Parry Sound—Muskoka in the 2015 and 2019 Canadian Federal elections, and member of Hiawatha First Nation took part in the 2003 MRH program. Cowie wrote the following after the trip:

I felt a deep sense of loss in Poland; a loss in humanity for the sacredness of life. My faith in the human race deteriorated a little more with each death camp we visited. [But] my deep sense of loss was accompanied by something greater; something that restored my faith. It was accompanied by hope [which I found] in my fellow participants. Each of my companions has a gift of giving me the ability to attempt to make a difference…. The camp [Auschwitz-Birkenau] that was once run by savage murderers was now overcome by people who condemned such acts of evil. This gave me hope that one day we shall overcome. I hope that it does the same for you.”

— Trisha Lynn Cowie, Witness: Passing the Torch of Holocaust Memory to New Generations
