= Kassan =

Kassan is a surname. Notable people with the surname include:

- David Kassan (born 1977), American painter
- Michael Kassan (born 1950), American digital media expert
