= Nate Leipciger =

Holocaust survivor and educator, author, and advocate

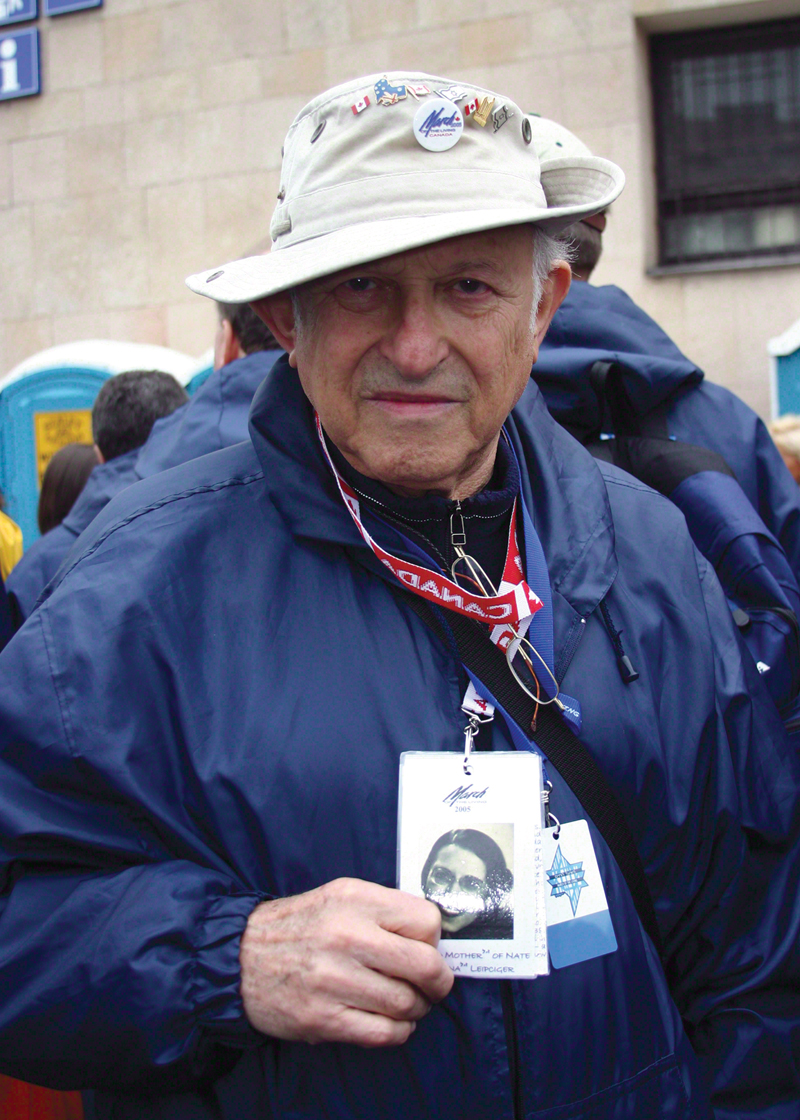
- Nate Leipciger at the 2019 March of the Living
- Born: 28 February 1928 (age 98); Chorzów, Second Polish Republic
- Notable work: The Weight of Freedom

Nathan Leon Leipciger C.M. MSM SMV LL.D. (honoris causa) (born 28 February 1928 in Chorzów, Poland) is a Holocaust survivor and educator. He has been an active Holocaust educator for over 30 years, public speaker and author from Toronto.

He was awarded the Meritorious Service Medal on 9 May 2000 and the Sovereign's Medal for Volunteers in 2017 by the governor general of Canada, in recognition of his extensive volunteer work in Holocaust education and remembrance activities . In 2019, he was awarded an honorary Doctorate of Laws in recognition of his lifelong dedication to Holocaust education and human rights advocacy. He Co-founded, along with Gerda Frieberg, the Toronto Holocaust Education and Memorial Centre in 1985 and served on the International Council of the Auschwitz‑Birkenau Museum for 15 years. He is a dedicated speaker with Canada's March of the Living delegation. By 2025, he marked his 21st participation—he consistently emphasizes combating hatred and preserving memory. Leipciger is the author of The Weight of Freedom (Le Poids de la liberté), recounting his Holocaust journey and post-war life.

== Early life ==
Forced to leave their home in Chorzów when the Germans invaded Poland, Leipciger and his family were moved to the Sosnowiec Ghetto. in Sosnowiec, he became an apprentice electrician in a shoe factory, a skill that later proved vital for survival.

At age 15, he, his sister and mother were transferred to Auschwitz-Birkenau. His mother and sister were murdered in Auschwitz, but his father kept close to his son. Leipciger ended up as forced labour in various other camps in Silesia. His father intervened twice, saving him from immediate death—first during selection (the queue for the gas chamber) and again by convincing an SS officer of Leipciger's trade skills, convincing the officers that his son was a useful electrician. Leipciger was allowed to accompany his father. According to Leipciger, his father begged a Nazi officer to get Leipciger to a factory in Germany to save him from being murdered at Auschwitz. This intervention led them to endure a staggering six more camps after Auschwitz, including Gross-Rosen, Flossenbürg, and Mühldorf, ultimately surviving against overwhelming odds. By liberation in April 1945, only he and his father remained alive.

They were incarcerated in the concentration camps of Fünfteichen, Gross-Rosen and Flossenbürg before ending up at Waldlager V, part of the Mühldorf camp complex and a subcamp of the Dachau concentration camp, where they were eventually liberated by American soldiers.

In June 1948, after living in Bamberg, Germany, for three years, Leipciger and his father immigrated to Canada. He earned an engineering degree following an accelerated path through high school, built a successful career as an engineer, raised a family with three daughters, and eventually became a citizen. His father, Jacob, remained a central figure in his life, credited by Leipciger as indispensable to his survival.

== Education and memorial centre ==
Along with Gerda Frieberg, Leipciger co-founded the Toronto Holocaust Education and Memorial Centre in 1985. The centre has educated over 25,000 students and visitors each year, establishing itself as a prominent Ontario institution focused on combating prejudice and racism. This, and other initiatives and work in the field of Holocaust education, led to the governor general awarding both Friedberg and Leipciger with a Meritorious Service Medal on 9 May 2000, calling them "advocates for Holocaust awareness and being the "driving force behind the 1985 opening of the Toronto Holocaust Education and Memorial Centre." In March 2020, the Toronto Holocaust Museum temporarily closed to relocate and expand into a larger, redesigned space within the same renovated 10,000 square foot community facility. With COVID-19 affecting many organizations at the time, the museum transitioned to virtual programming, enabling staff to concentrate on the development and construction during the closure. The museum is operated by the UJA Federation’s Neuberger Holocaust Centre and was supported by a $12 million donation from the Azrieli Foundation. The renovated museum plans include a 40-seat theatre, four themed galleries, and a learning lab for deeper engagement.

Leipciger spoke at the new museum before it re-opened on 9 June 2023. In recalling those early years before arriving at 11 years of age, he remarked, "Before any atrocity happens, life is normal", explaining to his audience how quickly ordinary life can give way to unimaginable horrors.

=== Liberation75 ===
Liberation75 is a Toronto-based nonprofit organization founded in 2018 to commemorate the 75th anniversary of the Holocaust's end. It collaborates with survivors, descendants, educators, and partner institutions to develop innovative Holocaust education programs aimed at combating antisemitism and other forms of hatred. Their "Student Day 2025" program included a segment titled "Holocaust Survivor Nate Leipciger's Testimony Presented by His Granddaughter." His story was conveyed via interviews and a presentation, focusing on his life in Canada, experiences during WWII, and lessons about overcoming hatred and embracing peaceful coexistence.

As part of Liberation75's Virtual Holocaust Library, a recorded session/testimony featured Holocaust survivors Leipciger and Dr. Miriam Klein Kassenoff discussing their experiences related to liberation at the end of World War II. The production includes reflections on post-war freedom and the importance of historical memory. The session also touches on educational themes aimed at future generations.

== The Weight of Freedom ==
In 2015, The Weight of Freedom was published, a 280-page book written by Leipciger, one of over 60 books in the Azrieli Series of Holocaust memoirs by Canadian survivors. The memoir balances raw depictions of trauma with reflections on survival, resilience, and the "weight" carried into freedom. It addresses the challenges of post-war identity, the difficulty of reconciling traumatic memories, and the responsibility understood by survivors to educate future generations. With an introduction by Deborah Dwork, the narrative is praised for being introspective, unflinching, yet infused with hope and moral insight. Bill Gladstone, a respected Holocaust scholar, described it as "gripping, moving and insightful,

== Visit to Auschwitz-Birkenau with Prime Minister Trudeau ==
On 10 July 2016, after attending a NATO summit in Warsaw, Prime Minister Justin Trudeau requested a visit to Auschwitz–Birkenau. He chose to be accompanied by Holocaust survivor Leipciger, then 88, who shared his firsthand insights from the camp where he was imprisoned at age 15. The pair walked through both Auschwitz I and Auschwitz II–Birkenau, viewing the railway ramp, gas chamber ruins, crematoria, and displays of victims' belongings, guided by the Auschwitz Museum director.

At the gas chambers and boxcar ramp, Leipciger recounted the moment when he and his mother and sister were torn apart. He recited Kaddish, the Jewish prayer for the dead. It was reported that Trudeau was visibly moved to tears, as he and Leipciger shared a profound experience at the place of Leipciger's suffering. Leipciger described it as "the moment of greatest impact." He placed his hands on Trudeau's head and offered the Priestly Blessing. At one point, Prime Minister Trudeau asked Leipciger, "How did you survive?" Leipciger credited his father's courage, rescuing him from the gas chambers.

Afterward, Leipciger reflected: "When Prime Minister Trudeau and I shed tears together in Auschwitz-Birkenau, never have I been more grateful for the welcome given to me by my adopted land, never have I been prouder to be a citizen of our beloved country, Canada. It was one of the most uplifting moments of my life."

The prime minister said, "This past July, I was privileged to walk the grounds of Auschwitz with Nate Leipciger. It was a tremendously moving experience, one that will stay with me forever."

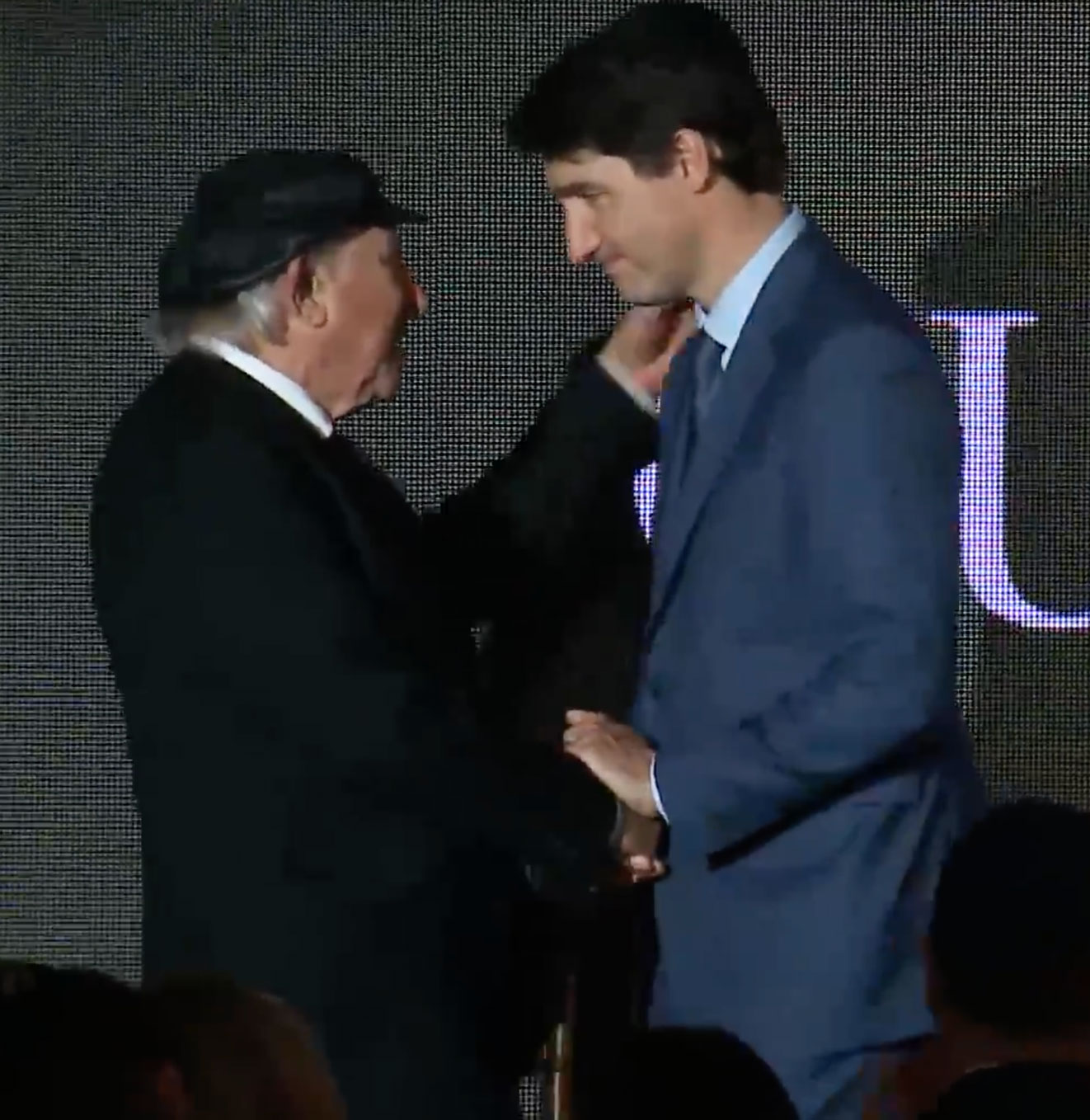
Leipciger embraces Justin Trudeau, prime minister of Canada, at the 30th Anniversary Gala of March of the Living Canada in Toronto in May 2018.

== Volunteer activities ==
Leipciger has volunteered with multiple Holocaust and community organizations, including the Toronto Holocaust Remembrance Committee, the Canadian Jewish Congress, the Neuberger Holocaust Education Centre, the International Council to the Museum of Auschwitz-Birkenau, and Facing History and Ourselves.

International March of the Living publicly congratulated Leipciger and thanked him for his 21 years of participation to the March.

In his book Witness: Passing the Torch of Holocaust Memory to New Generations, author Eli Rubenstein quotes an exchange between Leipciger and one of the young Toronto students on the March of the Living.

Leipciger: "You cannot have hate in your heart without being hateful against yourself. And that's the big problem – when you are hateful, you become bitter, you resent everything and that becomes part of your nature." Student: "You don't hate the soldiers, who took those kids out [and murdered them]?" Nate Leipciger: "There is a difference between hating and holding them responsible. They are two different feelings. I don't have to like them, but I don't hate them. Because hate will destroy the person doing the hating."

== Holocaust education work ==
Leipciger has given testimony several times with USC Shoah Foundation, speaking about his father, Jacob Leipciger, whom he recognizes as the reason he survived the Holocaust. On 13 February 1996, Leipciger took part in "A Father and Son Story" for Father's Day. The show was to recognize and celebrate life-saving actions taken by fathers during the Holocaust. In his testimony, he was asked, "what gave you the will to go on?" Nate Leipciger answered, "my father...the fact that we were together."

On 26 May 2019, Crestwood High School did an extensive interview with Leipciger about his childhood, the war beginning and ghettos being created, his deportation to Auschwitz, imprisonment, liberation, and views on using the lessons of the past to build a stronger future.

29 March 2023, International March of the Living released "2023 Survivor Spotlight," featuring Leipciger in March as part of the Canadian delegation in which he participates regularly. He said, "In my opinion, there is no more impactful way to tell the story of the Shoah than on the site where it took place. During the March, my suffering – the hunger, isolation, fear, degradation, incarceration, and loss of family – comes back to me, and I am transported back to the reality of what defines the Shoah for me."

"As a survivor and educator, nothing can be more rewarding than telling my story in the barracks of Birkenau and seeing the understanding and compassion written on the tear-stained faces of the participants, knowing they have become the new witnesses who will carry the story of the Shoah to the next generation."

"Be proud of our achievements and contributions to the Jewish people and the world. Stand up to racism and antisemitism, and fight with determination using all available elements of our free society through legislation and education. Stand your ground with truth and knowledge and defy false narratives and falsehoods. Join the fight for all human rights. Remember that we have the same rights as all other people; the right to live with dignity, respect, freedom from discrimination, freedom of religion and the right to worship in the manner we choose."

In an article written by Eli Rubenstein, Leipciger talked about the intersectionality of the Holocaust and the 7 October attack in Israel. When asked how he, as a survivor, compared the Holocaust with 7 October 2023, he said, "I think it is a situation which we as human beings have never seen. It’s a barbarism and I cannot equate it with anything else," describing the attack as worse than the Shoah.

Leipciger spoke at the New York Stock Exchange on Holocaust Remembrance Day, January 27, 2026 to share his life story and reflections, witnessing the horrors of Auschwitz-Birkenau. He explained the importance of Holocaust remembrance as a moral obligation, not just a historical fact, to help prevent future atrocities. He said that denying or minimizing the Holocaust erases victims' experiences and emphasizes the need for honest education across generations. Leipciger connected this responsibility to modern life, including business, technology, and society, advocating that innovation be guided by empathy, justice, and respect for human dignity.

== 2024 March of the Living Letter to Participants ==
In 2024, Leipciger addressed Canadian participants in the March of the Living through a public letter published by The Canadian Jewish News. Drawing on his decades of involvement in Holocaust education, he described the March as a powerful form of remembrance because it brings young people to the sites where the Holocaust took place. In the letter, he emphasized that participants who hear survivor testimony at Auschwitz-Birkenau become “new witnesses,” responsible for carrying Holocaust memory to future generations.

=== 80th anniversary & March of the Living: 2025 ===
On 24 April 2025, the 80th anniversary of Auschwitz's liberation, Leipciger participated in the March of the Living for his 21st time. The event brought together 80 Holocaust survivors—40 from Israel and 40 from the diaspora—along with thousands of participants. He has been outspoken in his fight against antisemitism, saying, "Everyday could have been my death... Jewish rights are also human rights!"

=== Bearing Witness: Holocaust education and survivor testimony (2025) ===
Leipciger, aged 97, a prominent speaker and advocate for Holocaust education, was brought to the town of Fort Frances, and the surrounding Rainy River District in Ontario to share his story. The event, titled "Bearing Witness: Holocaust Education and Survivor Testimony," took place on October 21, 2025 at the Townshend Theatre, with plans for more sessions at the local high school and Cornerstone Christian School for the next two days.

The initiative to bring Leipciger to the Rainy River District was prompted by local pastor, Ben Mast of the Rainy River Evangelical Covenant Church, and with the assistance of Leipciger's daughter. Pastor Mast met Leipciger earlier in 2025 during the March of the Living program in Poland. During their conversation, Mast learned that Leipciger's former engineering firm had previously undertaken hospital projects in the Fort Frances area, creating a local connection inspiring the invitation for the visit. Leipciger was quoted as saying, "Rainy River, of course, for decades, I worked in electrical engineering on the hospital there and in Atikokan, Sioux Lookout, and Fort Frances."

Organizers described Leipciger's visit as timely amid concerns about rising antisemitism and hate speech. The trip was funded through community donations exceeding $5,000 and was intended to provide residents with the opportunity to hear firsthand testimony from a Holocaust survivor, highlighting the ongoing importance of Holocaust education and remembrance.

== March of the Living 2026 ==
At the 2026 March of the Living in Auschwitz, Leipciger, participating for his 22nd time, issued a public warning about rising antisemitism in Canada, urging authorities and society to take stronger action. He described a growing loss of safety for Jewish communities, citing recent personal experiences in Toronto, Canada, including the removal of mezuzahs from his residence and a shooting attack targeting his synagogue.

Leipciger emphasized that living in a democratic country should guarantee equal rights and security, but said recent events have undermined that sense of safety. He warned that failing to confront antisemitism and misinformation risks repeating historical patterns, stressing the need to “stand up” against hatred rather than remain passive. Leipciger’s warning was driven by his recent personal experiences with antisemitism in Toronto and his concern over increasing incidents in Canada.

The running is over. For centuries, we ran. We have to stand up for our right to live as Jews in any country, including Israel, as free citizens enjoying the fruits of Western culture, of which we are part.

— Nate Leipciger, April 14, 2026, Auschwitz

Leipciger was the subject of a documentary titled, "There's Always A Better Tomorrow," filmed during the 2026 March of the Living, which documented his return to Auschwitz-Birkenau for the 22nd time as a survivor educator. The film follows him as he guides participants through locations tied to his Holocaust experiences and reflects on remembrance, family loss, and the life he rebuilt in Canada after the war.

== National & provincial recognition ==
In 2026, Leipciger was appointed to the Order of Ontario, the province’s highest civilian honour, in recognition of his lifelong commitment to Holocaust education, human-rights advocacy, and community service. He has been recognized for decades spent sharing his testimony with students and communities across the Canada. The article announcing the appointment mentioned he has also contributed locally to civic development in northwestern Ontario, including efforts supporting hospital construction in the Rainy River District.

On 30 June 2025, at age 95, in recognition of Leiciger's decades-long commitment to Holocaust education, and nationwide contributions: speaking tours, writings, museum leadership, and educational programming, earned him the national honour of an appointment to the Member of the Order of Canada (C.M.). The Governor General, Her Excellency the Right Honourable Mary Simon, wrote, "Nate Leipciger has been a force for Holocaust education for decades. A dedicated educator with the March of the Living for more than 30 years, he has mentored thousands of students on the dangers of bigotry and intolerance, and has inspired thousands more with his personal story of resilience, love and forgiveness."

=== Walk With Israel (2026) ===
In June 2026, Leipciger participated in Toronto’s annual Walk With Israel, an event that drew more than 60,000 participants. At age 98, he cut the ribbon at the start of the route and urged the community to stand proudly against antisemitism, saying, “We’re going to march like never before.”

== After 7 October 2023 and antisemitism ==
Leipciger has been interviewed numerous times about his thoughts and feelings on the events of 7 October attack in 2023 and the ongoing war between Israel and Palestine. The Combat Antisemitism Movement (CAM) and International March of the Living featured Leipciger one month after the 7 October attack. Leipciger spoke about being attacked in the streets as a little boy in Poland. He spoke about the number on his left forearm, and how this became his only identification. He also spoke about his entire family being murdered. "I am devastated to see that Jews are being attacked on the streets today and on campuses." Leipciger stated, "Jews are not safe... anywhere. I saw where antisemitism can lead. Don't be a bystander, fight antisemitism now."

In 2024 Leipciger was interviewed on the Avrum Rosensweig Show with Eli Rubenstein about the response of Jewish people around the world and how they respond to the level of antisemitism today. When asked if Leipciger was surprised at the level of antisemitism in the world today, he replied, "I am surprised. I shouldn't be, but I am. 80 years after Auschwitz [the Holocaust] is not a long time, and when the vengeance with which antisemitism has returned has eliminated the gap between then and now... I think [like most people] I feel disappointed, I feel troubled, I feel horrified by the loss of life we have witnessed on Oct 7, and with the brutality with which it was conducted. It was unequal, even Isis didn't show pictures like that."

== Public responses ==
In a 2024 letter published in The Canadian Jewish News, Leipciger addressed Canadian participants in the March of the Living, and described participation in the march as both an act of remembrance and a moral obligation, emphasizing the importance of learning directly at historical sites. He encouraged students to become "witnesses" to the Holocaust by preserving and sharing survivors' testimonies, and stressed the need to uphold values such as responsibility, resilience, and opposition to hatred. The letter underscored the urgency of Holocaust education with the number of survivors declining.

At the graduating class of 2019 at the University of Toronto covocation, Leipciger, draped in a Canadian flag, was filmed accepting an honorary Doctor of Laws (LL.D., honoris causa) in recognition of his longstanding contributions to Holocaust education and human rights advocacy. During the formal assembly, he spoke about the importance of historical memory, stating: "The memory of the Holocaust must be preserved, not only because of the victims, but also because we have to learn from the past to protect the future." He addressed the dangers of hatred and its consequences, saying: "Hatred leads to Auschwitz. Hatred leads to the murder of innocent people. It leads to genocide." Leipciger concluded his remarks with a message directed at the graduates: "This is your world. Your life is ahead of you. The ball is in your hands."

In December 2025, Leipciger, residing in Toronto, Canada, was publicly cited in multiple news reports after a series of antisemitic incidents involving the removal of mezuzahs (Jewish prayer scrolls affixed to doorposts) from residential buildings where he and other Jewish residents live. Leipciger, expressed that the removal of mezuzahs from his condominium complex during the Christmas holidays made him feel less safe and emotionally shaken, characterizing the acts as an invasion of personal security and a disturbing example of antisemitism in Canada. He was quoted as saying, "[Mezuzahs are] an indication that we are a Jewish home and that we are not afraid to display the fact that we are Jewish on our doorpost."

Leipciger emphasized his concern for his and the broader impact on Jewish identity and community, noting he worries that younger generations may feel pressured to hide their heritage. He urged members of the Jewish community not to conceal their identity, saying, "Don’t hide your symbols — stand up to whoever it is, because they want you to cower and hide your identity, because that's what they need." On Holocaust remembrance day 2026, in a symbolic response to the incident directly mentioned above, Leipciger was presented a new mezuzah constructed from repurposed missile debris as a message of resilience and identity.

The CEO of International March of the Living, Scott Saunders said, “I think of all that Nate endured during the Holocaust. Now, as he approaches his 98th year, it’s unthinkable that he has to worry about antisemites desecrating Jewish symbols in the very building in which he lives, along with other Holocaust survivors, in his adopted country Canada.”

=== Marking the 87 Years Since the Beginning of WWII ===
Nate Leipciger at Congregation Habonim Toronto in the new Rabbi office, after completing a short film for students with March of the Living (Aug, 2026)

In September 2026, Leipciger addressed Jewish students worldwide through an open letter and accompanying video message released at the beginning of the academic year. Published on September 1, the 87th anniversary of the outbreak of the Second World War, the initiative was led by the International March of the Living and promoted in partnership with organizations including the World Union of Jewish Students, the Jewish Agency for Israel, the World Zionist Organization, the Israeli-American Council and Students Supporting Israel. The Jerusalem Post reported that the letter and video were expected to reach hundreds of thousands of students internationally.

Drawing on his experiences as a Holocaust survivor and educator, Leipciger discussed antisemitism experienced by Jewish students following October 7, 2023. He said universities should be places where people can openly debate issues and criticize any government, including Israel’s. However, he stressed that criticism is different from harassing or excluding Jewish students, celebrating violence against Jews, or blaming all Jews for the actions of Israel. He encouraged students to strengthen their knowledge of Jewish history, remain connected to their identity, support classmates experiencing fear or isolation, build alliances and oppose racism and other forms of discrimination.

In the accompanying filmed message, Leipciger delivered the appeal directly to students, urging them not to conceal their Jewish identity or allow antisemitism to define them. He connected his continued hope to the rebuilding of Jewish life after the Holocaust and to his nearly three decades of accompanying March of the Living participants at Auschwitz. He concluded the message with the statement, “Antisemitism is old. Your future is not.”
