= Stephen D. Smith =

UK Holocaust specialist (1967-)

Stephen David Smith is British a Holocaust and genocide specialist who has designed, operated and consulted for many different Holocaust memorial centres. He currently holds the UNESCO Chair on Genocide Education.

== Early life ==
Smith was born on 15 April 1967, the elder son of Eddie Smith, a Methodist minister and Marina Smith, a teacher.

In 1995, he founded the Beth Shalom Holocaust Centre in Nottinghamshire with his younger brother James Smith, and together they also founded Aegis Trust in 2000.

Upon graduating from the University of London in 1991 with a degree in Theology, Smith attended the Oxford Centre for Hebrew Studies in 1992, and received his Doctorate from the University of Birmingham in 2000, having focused his postgraduate study on the "Trajectory of Memory", examining how Holocaust survivor testimony developed over time. His autobiography, Never Again Yet Again, A Personal Struggle with the Holocaust and Genocide, was published in 2009.

== Holocaust education ==
Smith has consulted on the development of a number of Holocaust memorial and education centres overseas, including Lithuania's House of Memory and the Cape Town Holocaust Centre in South Africa, which was heavily inspired by a visit from the founder, Myra Osrin, to the UK Holocaust Centre.

In 2004, Smith was project Director of the Kigali Memorial Centre, the genocide memorial museum and education centre in Kigali, Rwanda. Aegis was commissioned by Kigali City Council to establish the Kigali Memorial Centre, which opened in 2004 and still operates today.

Smith is a member of the United States delegation to the Inter-governmental Taskforce on Holocaust Education, Remembrance and Research (ITF), founded by Sweden, the US and the UK on the personal initiative of the then Swedish Prime Minister, Göran Persson. He was a member of the British delegation from 1998, when the ITF was founded, moving to the American delegation in 2009 following appointment to the USC Shoah Foundation Institute (see below). Over 20 countries are now part of the ITF. Smith was an advisor to Göran Persson's series of intergovernmental conferences, the Stockholm International Forum. The four conferences addressed, The Holocaust (2000); Combatting Intolerance (2001), Truth, Justice, and Reconciliation (2002), Preventing Genocide (2004).

One early outcome of the work of the ITF was the development of the UK's national Holocaust Memorial Day, inaugurated in 2001. Smith played a central role in this and served as an advisor to the Home Office on the Day's development over the years, and was appointed the inaugural Chair of the Holocaust Memorial Day Trust in November 2004 when the decision was made that the running of the Day should be handed over to a non-Governmental charitable body.

Smith has developed a reputation for his contribution to the field in the UK and abroad. Recognition for his work includes being made an Officer of the Order of the British Empire in the 2000 New Year Honours, the Interfaith Gold Medallion (2000), and Honorary Doctorate in Law from the University of Leicester (2007) and an Honorary Doctor of Letters from Nottingham Trent University (2010).

Smith's publications include Making Memory: Creating Britain's First Holocaust Centre, Forgotten Places: The Holocaust and the Remnants of Destruction, and The Holocaust and the Christian World, which he co-edited with Carol Rittner and Irena Steinfeldt. Smith also co-produced "Death March: A Survivor's Story", which was broadcast on BBC Two and BBC Four. He is currently working on a memoir of his interviews with Holocaust survivor Pinchas Gutter.

On 15 August 2009, Smith took up the post of executive director of the USC Shoah Foundation Institute, the archive of Holocaust survivor testimonies initiated by Steven Spielberg in 1994. He left that position in 2021.

== Honorary degree ==
On 21 July 2010, almost twenty years after the Beth Shalom Holocaust Centre was founded, Smith, his brother James and their mother Marina were each awarded honorary degrees of Doctor of Letters (DLitt) by Nottingham Trent University.

== Personal life ==
Smith converted to Judaism in 2023.
