= Witness: Passing the Torch of Holocaust Memory to New Generations =

2015 book about the Holocaust

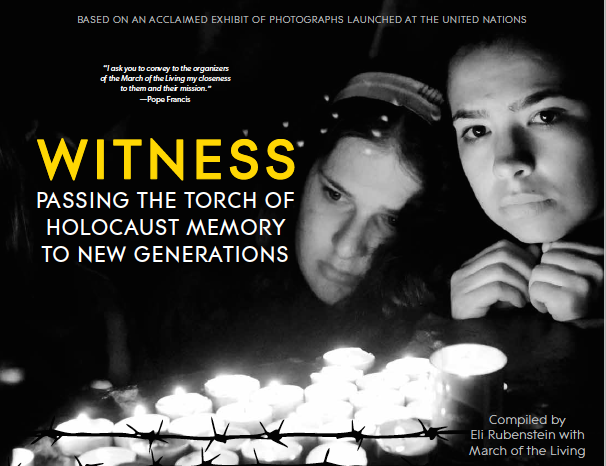
- Authors: Eli Rubenstein, March of the Living
- Language: English; Spanish; Hebrew; Polish
- Publisher: Second Story Press
- Publication date: 2015
- Publication place: Canada
- Media type: Book (Hardback)
- Pages: 136 (first edition)
- ISBN: 9781927583661

Witness: Passing the Torch of Holocaust Memory to New Generations is a volume published by Second Story Press motivated by a 2014 United Nations exhibition featuring reflections and visuals of Holocaust survivors alongside students participating in the March of the Living since 1988.

Both the original exhibition and the accompanying book (published in 2015) aim to inform a new generation of learners about the horrors of the Second World War. The book was produced in partnership with March of the Living, an organization dedicated to facilitating visits to the Polish sites of Nazi crimes, and Toronto-based religious figure and Holocaust educator Eli Rubenstein. Witness is available in English, Spanish, Polish, and Hebrew.

The book has an interactive feature and, in the revised edition, an afterword by Steven Spielberg, while the preface includes contributions from Pope Francis, Pope John Paul II and Barack Obama. In 2021 a short film based on the book was released and features recorded moments used in the exhibition and publication.

== Summary ==
Based on a photo exhibit launched at the United Nations in 2014, the book, released in 2015, documents experiences from Holocaust survivors revisiting concentration camps and the reactions of teenage visitors. Eli Rubenstein collected photos from the March of the Living Digital Archive Project, paired these with poems from teenage participants, and added historical sections to explain events. The book also outlines the commitment of participants to create a better world through education.

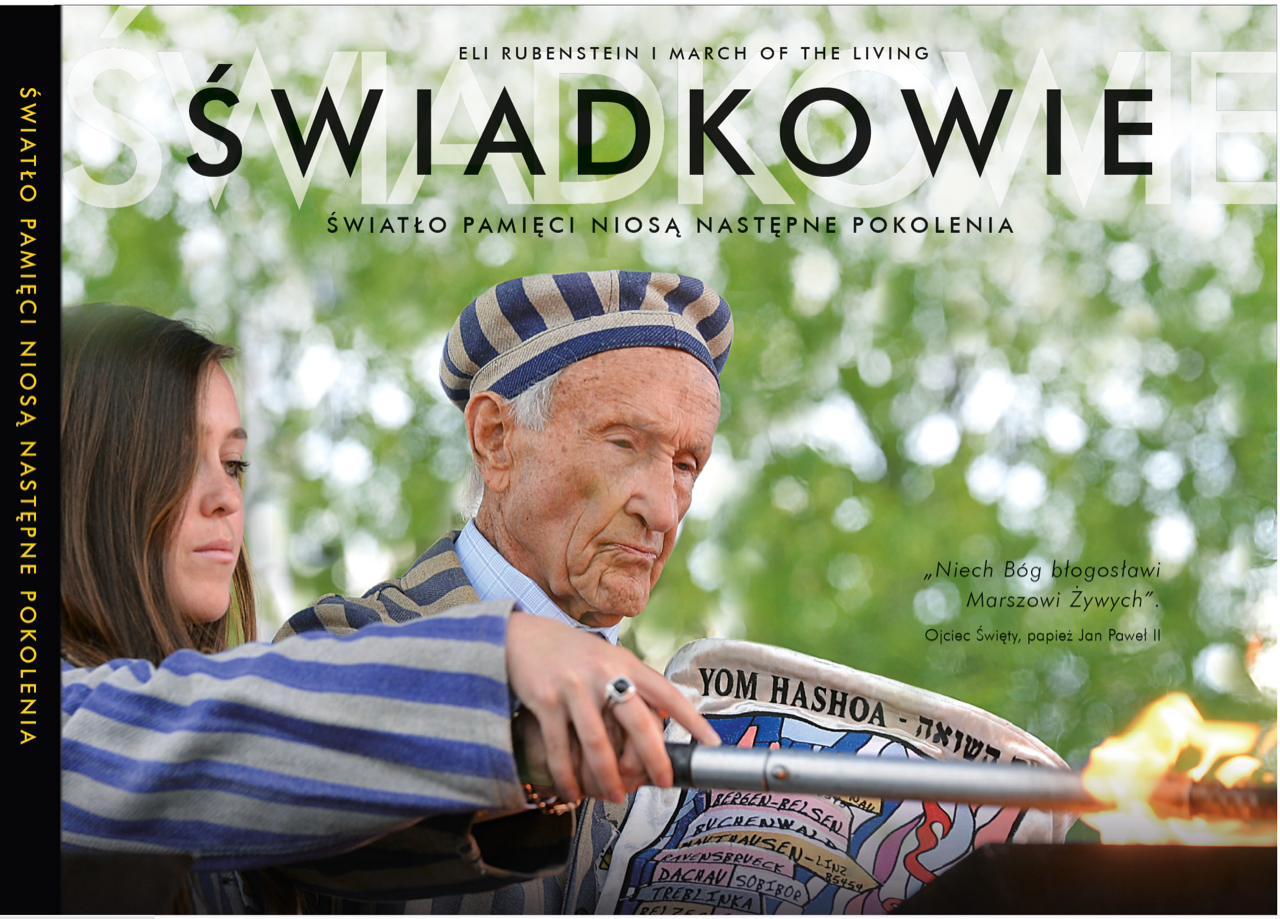
Cover of Polish language edition of Witness, with Survivor Edward Mosberg and granddaughter lighting a memorial torch on the March of the Living in Auschwitz-Birkenau

The initial chapter opens with an examination by witnesses and a summary of the context, the history of the Jews during World War II. The subsequent chapter is dedicated to the principal death camps located in Poland (Auschwitz, Treblinka, Majdanek, and Belzec), where systematic extermination occurred. The third chapter emphasizes acts of resistance amidst the Holocaust. Chapter four provides witnesses testimony about survival. The fifth chapter centers on the significance of survivors and the role of students in perpetuating Holocaust education and remembrance. The concluding chapter advocates for a dedication to fostering a new generation of witnesses through multiple avenues, including Holocaust studies.

The book includes interactive content via digital watermark links embedded in certain images of survivors, liberators, and Righteous Among the Nations. When scanned using a smartphone, the links direct readers to excerpts of video testimony on the USC Shoah Foundation Institute for Visual History and Education (created by Steven Spielberg) or March of the Living Digital Archive Project websites.

There is an afterword in the revised edition by Steven Spielberg, while the preface includes contributions from Pope Francis, Pope John Paul II and Barack Obama. In the afterword, Spielberg tells survivors, "Your stories are safe with us. They remind us not only of your steadfast courage but also that the days ahead will be filled with light and hope."

== Publication history ==
=== Translations ===
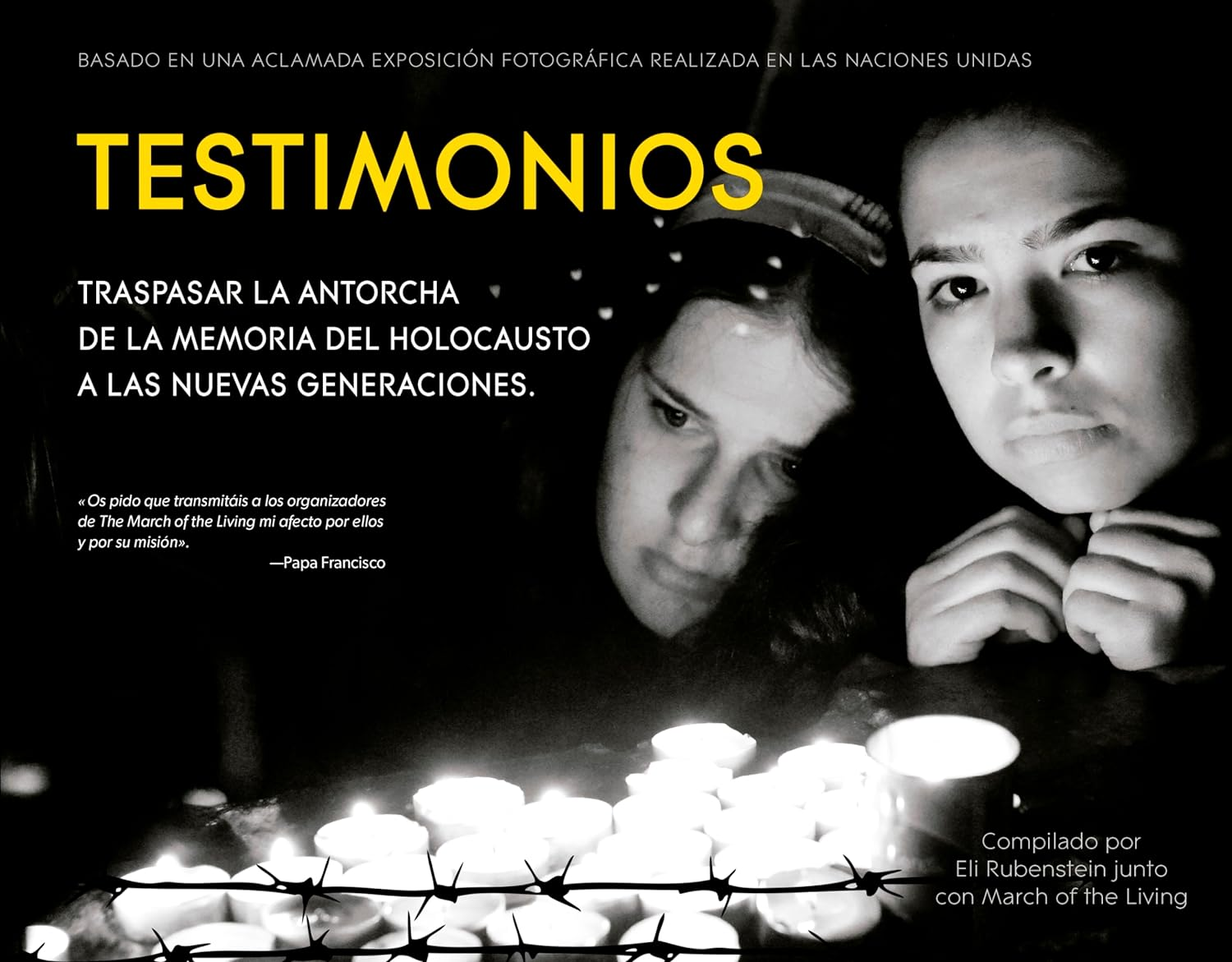
Witness: Spanish Edition

Witness has been translated into several other languages, including Polish, Spanish, and Hebrew.

=== Revised edition ===
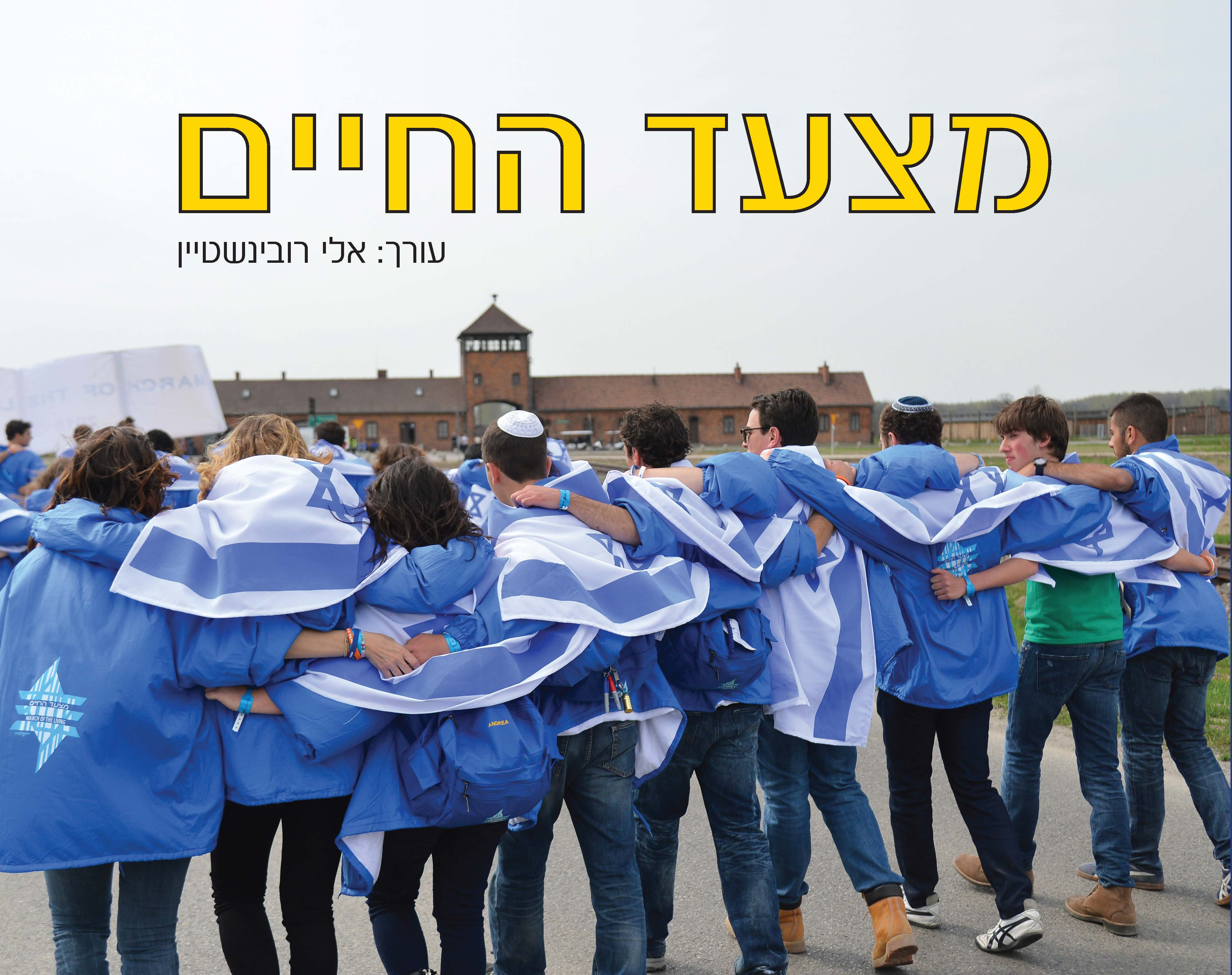
Witness: Hebrew Edition

In 2020, a special edition of the book was published in conjunction with "Liberation 75", an international Holocaust education initiative commemorating the 75th Anniversary of the end of WWII and the liberation of Europe from Nazi tyranny. In the new edition, each photo of a survivor, rescuer, or WWII liberator has an invisible barcode that links to their video testimony via mobile phone. There are 75 videos on the USC Shoah Foundation or March of the Living websites. The edition includes new liberation stories, content honoring those who rescued Jews, a new Afterword, and a Preface.

=== Short film ===
In 2021 a short film based on the book was released. Directed and produced by Naomi Wise, the director of the March of the Living Digital Archive Project, it features moments documented between survivors and students over the past 33 years used in the book.

=== Interactive content ===
The March of the Living Digital Archive Project, which hosts many of the videos linked in the book, was made possible in part through grants from the Citizenship & Immigration Canada – Multiculturalism Section, and the Claims Conference. The Digital Archives Project aims to gather Holocaust testimony from Canadian survivors who, since 1988, have traveled to Poland on the March of the Living to share their Holocaust stories with their young students in the original locations.

== Reception ==
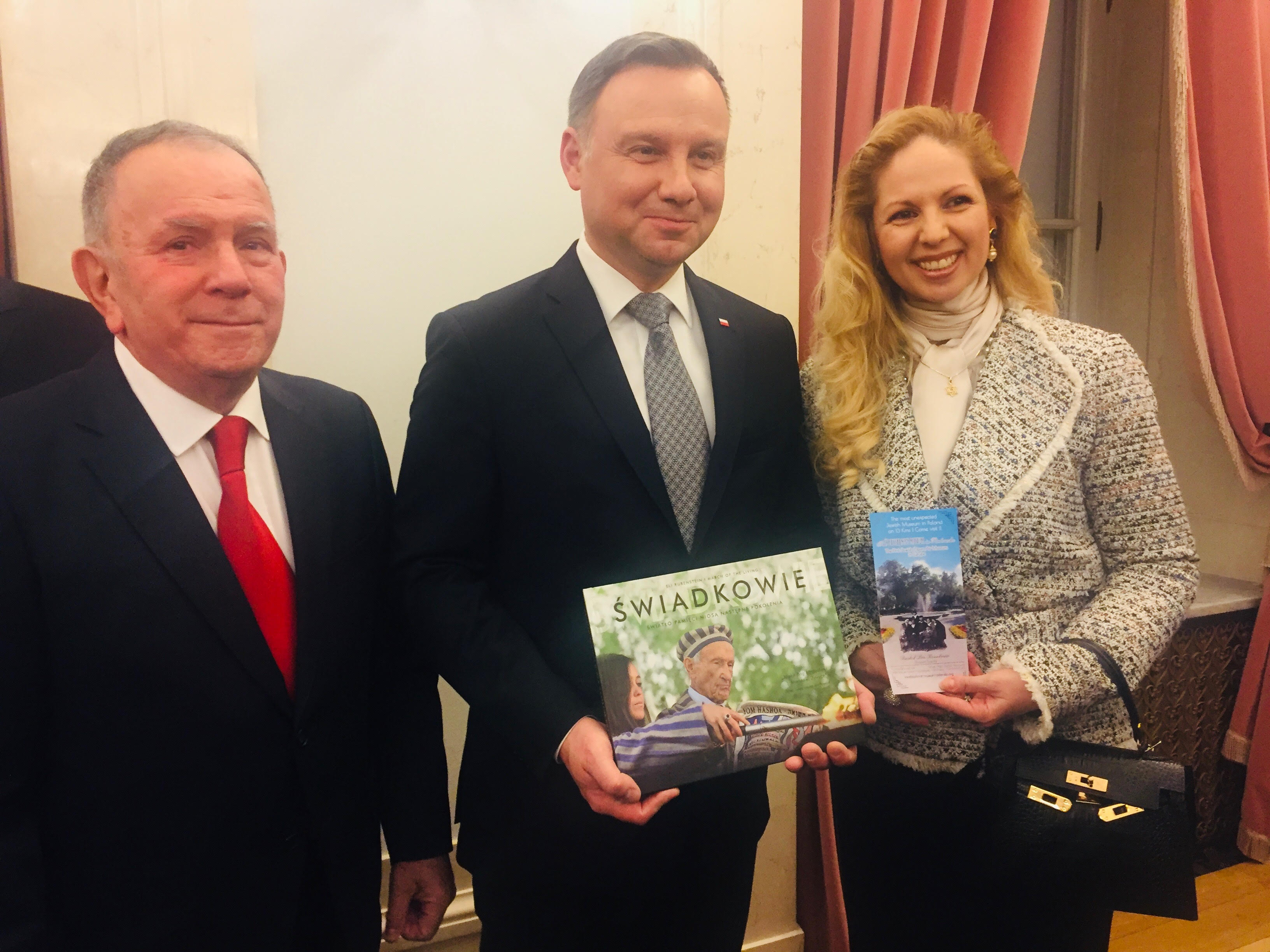
President of Poland Andrzej Duda (centre) and Aharon Tamir-March of the Living Deputy Chairman (left) with copy of Witness

Witness has overall received positive reactions and reviews.

Avrum Rosensweig in the HuffPost summarized the book with "The powerful aspect of Witness is that it stands on its own as a historical document and is an excellent, well laid out read for students of the Holocaust and those who are new to learning about this very complex time in history." Irene Tomaszewski in the Cosmopolitan Review called it "a remarkable volume that testifies to the power of remembrance, commemoration, and education." Canadian Jewish News described the book as "a treasure trove of photographs, poetry, commentary and history designed to enlighten a broad audience about the events of the Holocaust." In the Jerusalem Post, William B. Helmreich remarked, "Witness provides a capsule history of the Holocaust that is especially useful for someone who is unaware of what actually happened."

The hardback version has been criticized for its "oblong format" resulting in a "heavy awkward" publication. The accessibility concern was negated when the publication was released in digital and paperback formats.

In a review written after attending the 2019 March of the Living, Dariusz Stola, then Director of the POLIN Museum of the History of Polish Jews, reflected on the remarkable resilience of the survivors featured in Witness. He observed that despite enduring extreme brutality and confronting profound evil firsthand, many of them retained faith in humanity and remained committed to educating future generations. He highlighted the example of Max Glauben, who survived the Warsaw Ghetto and several concentration camps and repeatedly returned to the March to share his testimony, believing that young people must carry forward the memory of the Holocaust. Stola also referenced the moral messages emphasized by survivors such as Nate Leipciger and Roman Kent, who warned against hatred and stressed the ethical imperative of compassion.

Stola also expressed hope that more people across Polish society, including football players (and their supporters), would participate in the March of the Living. He wrote that direct encounters with history could serve as a powerful "vaccine" to prejudice, stating: "I am convinced that what they would see would be a better vaccine against the disease of racism and anti-Semitism than even the best school lessons."

== Notable excerpts ==
Pope Francis: "Work for peace. Unite with people from different cultures and religions. Keep an open heart. Don't discriminate. Welcome and understand others. May God bless you."

Pope John Paul II: "I know all about the March of the Living. God bless your daughter, and God bless the March of the Living."

President Barack Obama: "I think of Pinchas Gutter, a man who lived through the Warsaw Ghetto Uprising, and survived the Majdanek death camp…'I tell my story,' he says, 'for the purpose of improving humanity, drop by drop by drop. Like a drop of water falls on a stone and erodes it, so, hopefully, by telling my story over and over again, I will achieve the purpose of making the world a better place to live in.' Those are the words of one survivor – performing that sacred duty of memory – that will echo throughout eternity. Those are good words for all of us to live by."

Elie Wiesel: "Forever will I see the children who no longer have the strength to cry. Forever will I see the elderly who no longer have the strength to help them. Forever will I see the mothers and the fathers, the grandfathers and grandmothers, the little schoolchildren…their teachers…the righteous and the pious…. From where do we take the tears to cry over them? Who has the strength to cry for them?"

Steven Spielberg: "We've never had a Remembrance Day quite like this. But today, on Yom HaShoah, we gather for our first-ever virtual March of the Living. And I wish we could all be together in person. But what's important is that we are together now. Because this virtual gathering not only gives us a chance to remember the horrors we faced in the past, it also shines a light on the struggles that lie ahead and those we face as a community this very day. The work we are doing – which is your work – is already having a generational impact. So for that I can only say thank you. Thank you for your bravery. Thank you for your commitment to the March of the Living. And thank you for gathering today to look back, as we continue the vital work of ensuring a better future."

=== Survivor quotes ===
Faigie Libman: "When you have hatred in your heart, there is no room for love."

Nate Leipciger: "Hate will destroy the person doing the hating."

Max Glauben: "I am a strong believer that we must tell the stories to the youngsters – they are going to be our witnesses. But please present them in a way, with the kind of emotions, that will not create the same hatred that was done to us."

Elie Wiesel: "To be a survivor after the Holocaust, is to have all the reason in the world to destroy and not to destroy. To have all the reasons in the world to hate and not to hate… to have all the reasons in the world to mistrust and not to mistrust..."

Judy Weissenberg Cohen: "They say 'When you listen to a witness, you become a witness.' I am only asking you to work for a world where nobody will have to live with memories like mine ever again. Please heal the world."

== Bibliography ==
- Rubenstein, E.; Living, M. (2015). Witness: Passing the Torch of Holocaust Memory to New Generations. Second Story Press. ISBN 978-1-77260-008-7.
- Rubenstein, E.; Living, M. (2020). Witness, revised edition: Passing the Torch of Holocaust Memory to New Generations. Second Story Press. ISBN 978-1-77260-151-0.

== See also ==
- Holocaust survivors#Memoirs and testimonies
- Lessons of the Holocaust
- List of Holocaust memorials and museums#Poland
- List of Holocaust films
- List of posthumous publications of Holocaust victims
- The Holocaust in popular culture#Literature
