= Clouds Over Sidra =

2015 virtual reality film about the Syrian refugee crisis

Clouds Over Sidra is a 2015 virtual reality film about the Syrian refugee crisis. The movie was created by Gabo Arora and Chris Milk in partnership with the United Nations and Samsung. The film features a twelve year old in the Za'atari camp in Jordan, home to 84,000 Syrian refugees. It follows her throughout the day from her family's tent, to school, to a bakery, to a computer lab and the camp football pitch. It is the first film shot in virtual reality for the United Nations.

The film was directed by Gabo Arora and Barry Pousman and co-Produced by Samantha Storr, Socrates Kakoulides, Christopher Fabian and Katherine Keating.

It was first shown at the World Economic Forum in Davos, Switzerland, in January 2015.
