= Pinchas Gutter =

Holocaust educator

Pinchas Gutter CM
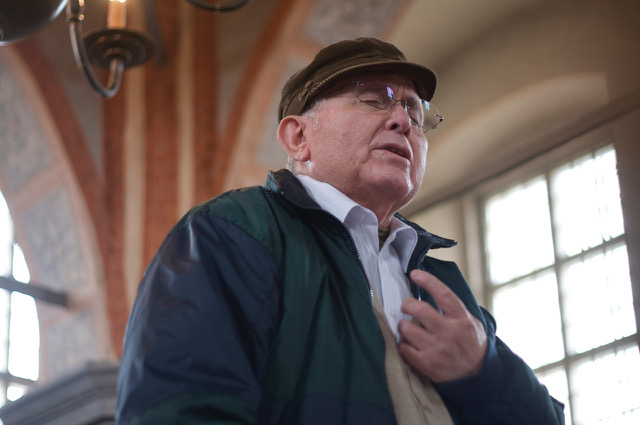
- Pinchas chanting traditional prayers in Tykocin Synagogue
- Born: 1932 (age 93–94); Łódź, Poland

Pinchas Gutter OC. (born 1932) is a Polish-born Holocaust educator. He is a frequent guest lecturer for the Sarah and Chaim Neuberger Holocaust Centre, March of the Living, and March of Remembrance and Hope programs. He is one of the pioneers of the Dimensions in Testimony project, which has created life-sized interactive avatars of Gutter and other survivors that can be wheeled into classrooms, lecture halls and museums. Gutter has also been the subject of a number of films by directors such as Fern Levitt, Eli Rubenstein, Stephen D. Smith and Zvike Nevo. In 2024, he was appointed as a member of the Order of Canada. He lives in Toronto.

== Early life ==
Gutter was born in 1932 in Łódź, Poland. After the Nazis occupied his hometown, Gutter was sent to Warsaw along with his mother and sister to live with a relative; his father thought that it would be safer there for his family. Gutter's father eventually joined them where they lived in the Warsaw Ghetto. They survived the big deportations of 1942, but after the 1943 Warsaw Ghetto Uprising was suppressed, they were rounded up by the Germans and sent to the Majdanek extermination camp. Gutter's parents and sister were killed. As recounted in Eli Rubenstein's Witness: Passing the Torch of Holocaust Memory to New Generations, Gutter saw his twin sister being taken with his mother to be murdered: "Who can forget Pinchas Gutter telling of the last time he saw his twin sister in Majdanek? All he can remembers the long, golden-blonde braid swinging behind her back as she was herded with their mother to her end. He cannot, try as he might, recall her face."

Gutter himself suffered a beating by a German guard, but survived and was then sent to a nearby labor camp, where he was part of a crew that manufactured mines and ammunition for the German army. Toward the close of the war, he found himself in Buchenwald. He was subsequently transported to another labor camp in Germany and later forced on a death march to Theresienstadt in northern Bohemia, now the Czech Republic. After being liberated by the Red Army in 1945, he was sent to Britain. In 1952, he enlisted in the Israeli army. He lived in Brazil and South Africa before immigrating to Canada in 1985.

== Dimensions in Testimony ==
Dimensions in Testimony is a project developed by Heather Maio of Conscience Display, made in a collaboration between the University of Southern California's Institute for Creative Technologies (ICT) and the University of Southern California's USC Shoah Foundation, a nonprofit established by American film director Steven Spielberg. It enables people—now and far into the future—to have a "virtual conversation" with Holocaust survivors about their life experiences.

The project integrates advanced filming techniques, specialized display technologies, and next-generation natural language processing to provide an intimate experience with Holocaust survivors who are uniquely qualified to offer personal reflections and answer direct questions about their firsthand experiences with the Holocaust. Algorithms dictate which responses are played back—akin to virtual assistants such as Apple's Siri and Microsoft's Cortana, except that while those pieces of software are designed to answer questions about emails or the weather, Dimensions in Testimony is based on communicating one person's experience of genocide.

Gutter was the first person to test-drive the new technology. On three occasions, he travelled to the Los Angeles-based foundation, where he sat in a dome lit by 6,000 LED lights, surrounded by 52 cameras. The lights were so blinding he had to wear protective glasses when he wasn't being filmed. He had to wear the same clothes and sit in the same position to maintain the continuity of the project. The prototype involved filming extensive interviews with Gutter. The team at ICT then used natural language processing software to help create an interactive version of the video footage, with vocal cues triggering responses from the pool of recorded speech in the 25 hours of video footage with Gutter, who spent a total of five days sitting in the sphere.

Drafting the more than 900 questions was also a challenge. Researchers had to start with the lowest level of knowledge about the Holocaust. One day, staff brought in their children to ask questions. Answers had to be recorded for questions that were off-topic and that were hypothetical. In testing, the software picked out the best answer for about 90 per cent of the questions asked.

The project won, among other awards, the interactive award and the audience award at the Sheffield documentary festival in 2016. The Illinois Holocaust Museum is the first Museum in the world to share the technology with the public at large. As of 2016, the project hoped to record ten survivors, five men and five women, who would reflect the diversity of the Holocaust experience, costing about $2 million initially and then $500,000 for each additional survivor who will be filmed. The ten testimonies from these Holocaust survivors were to be unveiled by the end of 2017.

== Films ==
=== The Void ===
For several years, USC Shoah Foundation Executive Director Stephen D. Smith and Gutter developed a friendship of trust in which they explored the life that resides in Gutter's memory. He took Smith into the world of the Gerrer Hassidimof Łódź, through the Warsaw ghetto uprising, to Majdanek and Terezín, London, Paris and Jerusalem. The film probes the dark corners of Gutter's memory and discovers how vibrant, and real memory can be, but also how dark and lonely and terrifying it is too. Loss and trauma, survival and hope, pain and healing, love and hate, people and their fading shadows are all there in the void, remembered and forgotten.

=== Political, Polish Jew: The Story of Pinchas Gutter ===
Zvike Nevo's documentary, which unfolds in chronological order from Gutter's birth in Łódź in 1932, is mostly about his survival as a Jew in Nazi-occupied Poland. Dow Marmur, rabbi emeritus at Toronto's Holy Blossom Temple said in his review in The Toronto Star that the film demonstrates that Gutter has harnessed his ordeal to the noble cause of tikun olam, the idea that Jews bear responsibility not only for their own moral, spiritual, and material welfare, but also for the welfare of society at large.

=== The Last Goodbye ===
Produced by USC Shoah Foundation with Ari Palitz and Gabo Arora and producer Stephen D. Smith in 2016, The Last Goodbye is a roomscale virtual reality experience that allows viewers to travel to the Majdanek concentration camp with Pinchas as he tells them about his early experiences there. The film premiered to high acclaim at the 2017 Tribeca Film Festival and took home the VR-Documentary Jury Prize at the 2018 Lumiere Awards. In 2019, Pinchas himself dubbed the Virtual Reality film into five new languages with the intent of bringing the film to global audiences in 2020.

=== A Holocaust Journey: Lessons We Learned ===
In 2016, Gutter was invited to travel with students of Saint Elizabeth University on a Holocaust study mission to share the experiences of his family in Poland during the Holocaust. The reactions of the non-Jewish students were filmed to create the documentary A Holocaust Journey: Lessons We Learned, in which Gutter leads the students through the Magdanek concentration camp in Lublin, Poland, explaining how his family was deported from the Warsaw ghetto, where he lost his family upon arrival, and where he thought he would be killed with Zyklon B gas.

== President Obama Speech ==
Speaking at USC Shoah Foundation's Ambassadors For Humanity Gala, President Barack Obama spoke about Pinchas Gutter saying, "I think of Pinchas Gutter, a man who lived through the Warsaw Ghetto Uprising, and survived the Majdanek death camp... 'I tell my story,' he says, 'for the purpose of improving humanity, drop by drop by drop. Like a drop of water falls on a stone and erodes it, so, hopefully, by telling my story over and over again, I will achieve the purpose of making the world a better place to live in.' Those are the words of one survivor—performing that sacred duty of memory—that will echo throughout eternity. Those are good words for all of us to live by."

== March of Remembrance and Hope and March of the Living ==
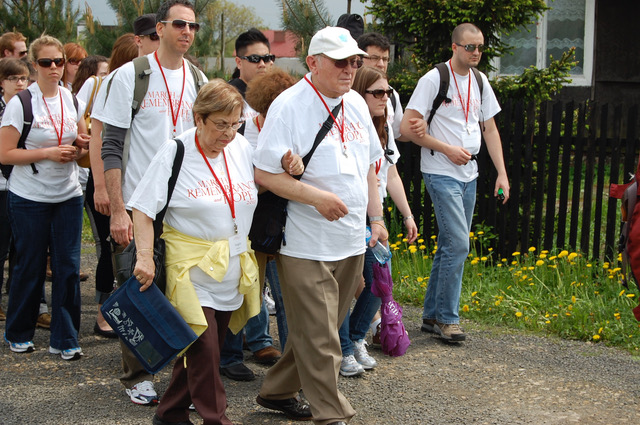
Pinchas Gutter leading the March of Remembrance and Hope in Auschwitz-Birkenau (March of Remembrance and Hope File Photo)

Pinchas Gutter has joined the March of Remembrance and Hope and the annual March of the Living programs in Poland, where he makes himself available to both high school and university students. During the March, Holocaust survivors walk alongside student participants for a 3 kilometres (1.9 mi) hike from Auschwitz to Birkenau on Holocaust Remembrance Day.

In 2009, Gutter appeared in "7 Days of Remembrance and Hope," which was aired on CBC's documentary channel. The story follows 60 university students from multi-faith backgrounds on the March of Remembrance and Hope to various historical sites centred around the Holocaust during WWII. Directed by Canadian Fern Levitt, the film won Best Documentary at the Chicago International Film Festival.

Gutter spoke about his commitment to Holocaust education in Witness: Passing the Torch of Holocaust Memory to New Generations, compiled by Eli Rubenstein, where he stated: "I always tell the young that I am carrying a torch of well-being and goodness. Despite the fact that it could have been a bitter one, I believe that Olympic torch, a torch that brings goodwill on Earth. We had a person named Moses on our trip, a survivor of the genocide in Rwanda. It was incredible how he bonded with me, by my being able to tell my stories. He wrote a letter about how it's much easier for him to accept, to live in the future because I have given him another Weltanschauung, a world view. It's very important for Holocaust survivors—or anybody else—to spread togetherness and goodwill—and I think it's the young people specifically who can create this. Because drop, by drop, by drop, like water on a stone, the world can become a better place."
