= Edward Mosberg =

Holocaust survivor, educator, and advocate (1926–2022)

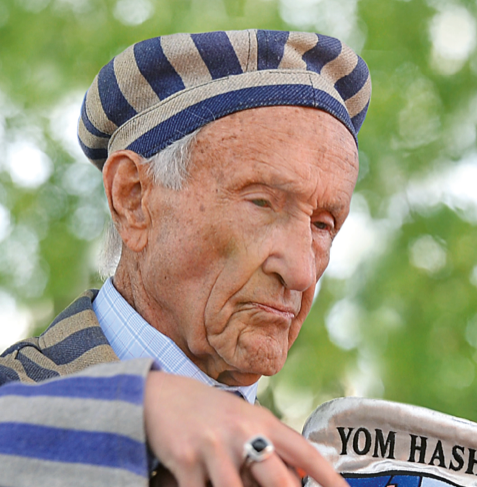
- Mosberg in 2017
- Born: January 6, 1926; Kraków, Poland
- Died: September 21, 2022 (aged 96); New Jersey, U.S.
- Burial place: Mt. Freedom Jewish Cemetery, Randolph, New Jersey
- Occupation: Real estate developer
- Known for: Holocaust survivor, educator, philanthropist
- Children: 3
- Awards: Order of Merit of the Republic of Poland

Edward Mosberg (January 6, 1926 – September 21, 2022) was a Polish-born Jewish American Holocaust survivor, educator, businessman, and philanthropist. During the Holocaust, he was held by the Nazis from 14 years of age in Kraków Ghetto, Kraków-Płaszów concentration camp, Auschwitz concentration camp, Mauthausen concentration camp, and a slave labor camp in Linz, Austria, that was liberated by the US Army in 1945. With nearly all of his family were murdered in the Holocaust, Mosberg became active in Holocaust remembrance and education, sharing testimony with students and participating in commemorations and survivor testimony initiatives. Mosberg joined delegations visiting former concentration camps through International March of the Living and advocated preserving authentic Holocaust history. In 2019, Mosberg was awarded the Order of Merit of the Republic of Poland, the highest civilian honor by Polish President Andrzej Duda.

== Early life ==
Mosberg was born in Kraków, Poland, to Bronislawa and Ludwig, and was Jewish. His parents owned a department store, and prayed at the Wolf Popper Synagogue. His two sisters were Halina and Karolina.

== The Holocaust ==
Mosberg was 13 years old in 1939, when Nazi Germany invaded his hometown. In 1940, during the German occupation of Poland in World War II, the Kraków Ghetto was established, and Mosberg’s immediate family—along with his grandparents, cousins, and an aunt were forced to live together in a single apartment. In 1941, his father was killed during a Nazi round-up. The following year, his grandmother, aunts, and cousins were deported to Bełżec extermination camp.

In 1943, when the Nazi's carried out the "final liquidation" of the Kraków Ghetto under the command of SS-Hauptsturmführer Amon Göth, the remaining Mosberg family was moved to the Kraków-Płaszów concentration camp in Płaszów just south of Kraków, a Nazi concentration camp operated by the SS, which had been constructed on the grounds of two former Jewish cemeteries. Mosberg witnessed many atrocities committed by SS camp commandant Amon Göth, who was later tried, convicted, and hanged as a war criminal in September 1946.

In May 1944, Mosberg's mother and sisters were sent to the Nazi death camp of Auschwitz concentration camp in southern Poland. Auschwitz was the largest Nazi concentration camp, and over a million Jews were killed there between 1940 and 1945. His mother was killed in an Auschwitz gas chamber, and then her body was sent to its crematorium. Mosberg was deported a few days later, first to Auschwitz, then to the Mauthausen concentration camp in Austria, where he performed slave labor. In Mauthausen, prisoners were forced to work in a quarry, pulling boulders as heavy as 110 pounds up 186 steps from morning until night, whipped by Nazi guards. Mosberg said: "If you stopped for a moment, the SS either shot you or pushed you off the cliff to your death." Mosberg was next sent to a slave labor camp in Linz, Austria. The camp was liberated by the U.S. Army on May 5, 1945. Nearly all of Mosberg's family were murdered during the Holocaust.

== Life after the Holocaust ==
After the war, Mosberg was sent to a hospital in Italy to recover from tuberculosis. While in Italy, he reconnected with Cecile “Cesia” Storch, whom he had previously met in the concentration camps and who had been imprisoned alongside his sisters. Cecile, who was born in Kraków, survived Auschwitz, although many members of her family were murdered during the Holocaust. Both Mosberg and Cecile were liberated from German concentration camps by American soldiers.

After liberation, Mosberg briefly returned to Poland, but due to persistent antisemitism, he and Cecile moved to Belgium. The couple married in Brussels in 1947. In 1951, they immigrated to the United States with their 18-month-old daughter, Beatrice, and settled in East Harlem, New York. They later had two more children, Louise (born in 1953) and Caroline (born in 1966), and by 2016 had seven grandchildren and two great-grandchildren. In the United States, Mosberg initially worked a series of small jobs before becoming a real-estate developer, and the family later lived in Parsippany and Morris Plains, New Jersey. Cecile died in 2020 at the age of 92, after 72 years of marriage.

== Promoting/Advocating Holocaust awareness ==
Mosberg devoted the final years of his life to Holocaust education and was among the strongest supporters of the International March of the Living, often attending the march wearing his original concentration camp uniform. He also appeared in two documentary films. He served as honorary chairman of From the Depths, an organization dedicated to “preserving the memory of the Holocaust and to give a name to those who were brutally murdered in the dark days of the Holocaust.” Mosberg was deeply committed to strengthening Polish–Jewish dialogue and relations, as well as recognizing the Polish Righteous Among the Nations.

In 2006, Mosberg donated a Torah that was hidden from the Nazis to the Mount Freedom Jewish Center. In 2007, Mosberg and his wife received the Yad Vashem Remembrance Award.

In 2009, Mosberg was one of half a dozen people who met with Pope Benedict XVI at the Yad Vashem Holocaust memorial in Jerusalem, Israel.

In May 2018, Mosberg co-signed a letter urging Jersey City Mayor Steven Fulop not to remove the Katyń Memorial from Exchange Place, writing, “The memory of the Katyn massacre is an important part of the memory and memories of the Holocaust and we encourage you to reconsider your decision to remove this monument.” On December 20, 2018, the nine-member Jersey City Council voted unanimously to adopt an ordinance ensuring that the monument would remain at Exchange Place “in perpetuity.”

In June 2019, Polish President Andrzej Duda honored Mosberg with the Commander's Cross of the Order of Merit of the Republic of Poland. It was given to Mosberg in recognition of his having developed Polish-Jewish dialogue, and his having promoted knowledge about the role of Polish people in saving Jews during the Holocaust.

I accept this award on behalf of myself, my wife, my children and grandchildren, and most importantly, in honor of my mother, father, siblings and six million Jews, brutally murdered by the Nazis during the Holocaust.

— Edward Mosberg, accepting the Commander's Cross of the Order of Merit of the Republic of Poland.

In 2020, Mosberg’s story was featured in the March of the Living book, Witness: Passing the Torch of Holocaust Memory to New Generations. Mosberg is on the cover lighting a memorial torch with his granddaughter on the March of the Living in Auschwitz on Holocaust Remembrance Day. The filmed documentary of the same name, premiered on i24 on International Holocaust Survivor Day, 2021. The documentary included footage of Mosberg returning to Mauthausen as well as marching on the March of the Living.

I'm walking now on the death steps of Mauthausen. 86 steps on the quarry. Many people died on those steps and I am now sitting here and resting. They could not sit down. So I'm here resting in their memories.

— Edward Mosberg, segment filmed by the USC Shoah Foundation.

Mosberg was the subject of a painting by artist David Kassan that appeared in September–December 2019 in an exhibition co-curated by the USC Shoah Foundation and USC's Fisher Museum of Art, named "Facing Survival".

That same year, he was diagnosed with blood cancer. Mosberg said he did not fear death, however, because: "First, I already beat death once after the war when I had final stage tuberculosis – and I can do it again. Second, I died already 70 years ago when the Germans murdered my whole family..."

Presenting Mosberg with the Ner Tamid Award for his global philanthropic work in February 2020, Consul General of Poland in New York City Adrian Kubicki said that the Polish and Jewish communities "have shared some beautiful moments and we also share some of the most painful memories," and that Mosberg was "an ambassador of truth" who has "done so much good around the world" in ensuring another tragedy like the Holocaust "never again happens to the Jewish nation, the Polish nation or any other nation."

In July 2020, American football player DeSean Jackson, who had posted social media messages—which he later apologized for—citing an anti-semitic quote that he thought was a quote from Hitler, accepted an invitation from the then-94-year-old Mosberg to join him on a visit to the Auschwitz concentration camp in Poland. Mosberg said: "Jackson was very respectful. I would like to say God Bless Mr. Jackson for accepting my invitation."

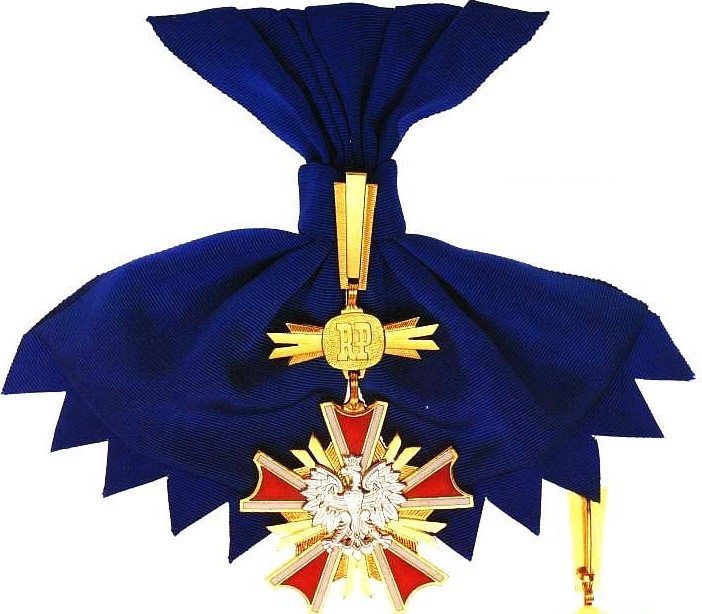
The Grand Cross of the Order of Merit of the Republic of Poland

Following his death in 2022, Polish President Andrzej Duda and his wife attended Mosberg's funeral. Duda subsequently announced that he was awarding Mosberg the Grand Cross of the Order of Merit of the Republic of Poland, the highest Polish award in its class. It was awarded in recognition of Mosberg's achievements in advancing Polish-Jewish dialogue and developing cooperation between nations, and for preserving the memory of and communicating what happened in the Holocaust. Duda said Mosberg was a great and brave man both as a Jew and as a Pole, astutely testified about the complex history of the Jews in Poland, and loved Poland.

After Mosberg had passed away, Polish Consul General Adrian Kubicki wrote that Mosberg was: "the most wonderful man I have ever met. He was a Holocaust Survivor, noble man and a great Polish patriot... My personal mentor. Irreplaceable."

== Working with organizations ==
Edward Mosberg’s testimony was recorded between June 10 and 14, 2018, as part of Dimensions in Testimony, a collection of 3D interactive genocide survivor testimonies produced by the USC Shoah Foundation.
