= David Kassan =

American painter

- Born: February 25, 1977; Little Rock, Arkansas
- Known for: Realism

David Jon Kassan (born February 25, 1977 in Little Rock, Arkansas) is an American painter best known for his life-size representational paintings, which combine figurative subjects with abstract backgrounds or trompe-l'œil stylings. Of this dual representation strategy Kassan notes, "my effort to constantly learn to document reality with a naturalistic, representational painting technique allows for pieces to be inherent contradictions; paintings that are both real and abstract".

Kassan currently lives in Albuquerque, New Mexico.

== Early life and education ==
David Kassan received his B.F.A. in 1999 from the College of Visual and Performing Arts at Syracuse University, Syracuse, NY. He continued his studies at The National Academy, and the Art Students League of New York, both in Manhattan

His Newington-Cropsey Foundation Travel Grant allowed him to study and sketch in Italy in the summer of 2003. There he conducted sketch studies of various masterworks, which are source of inspiration to his own work. These experiences were recorded in a self-published book "Lentemente Italia".

== Career ==
In 2013, he founded the Kassan Foundation in hopes of giving grants directly to underprivileged talent in both the visual and musical arts.

In 2014, Kassan turned his attention to painting and documenting Survivors of the Holocaust, with the development of the EDUT project)-"edut" being Hebrew for "living witnesses" as a way of connecting with his grandfather's traumatic history of escaping ethnic cleansing on the border of Romania and Ukraine to come to America in 1917. The EDUT project's mission is to meet with as many living Survivors to the Shoah as possible, and to document them in filmed video portraits and in paintings and drawings. While many survivors have already told their stories on video (as in the Visual History Archive developed by the USC Shoah Foundation) or in memoirs, Kassan believes painting offers viewers a different kind of connection to the survivors, one that puts a personal face to the sometimes abstract idea of the Holocaust.

In 2017, David Kassan partnered with the USC Shoah Foundation and the USC Fisher Museum of Art to develop the EDUT project into a Resilience Exhibition which opened at the Fisher Museum in the fall of 2019 in Los Angeles.

Holocaust survivor Edward Mosberg was the subject of a painting by Kassan that appeared in 2019 in an exhibition co-curated by the USC Shoah Foundation and USC’s Fisher Museum of Art, named "Facing Survival."

Kassan has given painting/drawing seminars and lectures at various institutions and universities around the world.

== Technique ==
Kassan has studied human anatomy extensively, reflecting a scientific understanding of the muscular structures beneath the skin. Kassan has written extensively on the subject and its relation to conveying emotion, including publishing an “Artist’s Guide to Portrait Anatomicae” and several articles on the topic for magazines such as Artist Daily. and a quarterly column on anatomy for Drawing Magazine

Kassan uses oil painting and drawing techniques to create realistic images of his subjects. He creates realistic flesh tones. Transparent layers of oil paint are built up, forming an intricate lattice of veins, blood and skin. Through this light enters and is reflected back.

His technique of creating layered application of pigments has been hailed by critics as creating a highly realistic impression of skin and flesh.

In addition to work in traditional drawing and painting media, Kassan has also explored the use of digital media, including the use of the iPad as a portable painting tablet, used for studies of masterworks in museums around the world. His YouTube demonstration "Finger Painting on the Apple iPad from the live model" now viewable at originally achieved over 1 million views within 6 months of posting. This also resulted in considerable news-media coverage in the printed press and on television.

== Reception ==
David Jon Kassan’s work has been described as "Raw, poignant and profoundly honest. He seeks to capture the essence of those he paints, imbuing them with their own voice. More than simply replicating his subjects Kassan seeks to understand them. We are moved by Kassan’s depictions, captivated by powerfully expressive hands, pensive faces, and flesh that appears warm to touch. Ultimately, there is a truth and timelessness to Kassan’s work because it is so deeply human. His subjects are distilled in an exact moment in time, patiently contemplating their present. We share in this present-moment appreciation, this slowing down of time, and see life for what it is."

== Kassan Foundation ==
In 2013, Kassan founded the Kassan Foundation in hopes of giving grants directly to underprivileged talent in both the visual and musical performance arts.

The aim of the Kassan Foundation is to nurture talent by offering financial support to underprivileged Visual Artists and Musicians. Each year the foundation offers two grants; one to a promising representational artist and one to a promising musician in order to boost their career and accelerate their artistic growth. The grant would assist with potential production and material costs, travel and further education.

== Documentary films ==
David Kassan has produced and filmed two Instructional Documentary films in partnership with Movette Pictures (Painting a Life) and Studio Four Cinematography (Drawing Closer to Life)

- Drawing Closer to Life (2010, Studio Four Cinematography). This 3 hour DVD documents a day in David Jon Kassan's Brooklyn studio as he develops a charcoal study of Henry Williams Oelkers. David vocalizes his complete thought process and approach as he develops this drawing. The essence of this DVD is developing an understanding of how to translate and interpret what we see into drawings that capture the subtle character, emotion and insights into the model's personality.
- Painting a Life (2014, Movette Pictures, http://www.movettepictures.com). In this 7-hour, two disc, instructional documentary, David weaves together his philosophies on painting as well as how he paints technically. In "Painting A Life", we get to know the subject, Jaece Lutrec. intimately—her thoughts, feelings and her life as David paints her. This film illustrates not just the step-by-step process of how David paints, but also depicts his patient search to understand the subject. To encourage a full understanding of the process, David completely vocalizes his thoughts on how to use broken color to develop lifelike skintones and how to use color temperature, value, texture and brushstrokes to turn form. Also discussed is how to train your eye to see these subtle color shifts and transitions. Included is a full discussion of David’s materials (brushes, mediums, paints, etc.), how he prepares his painting surfaces, his studio setup and lighting, how he transfers the drawing to the painting surface, a brief introduction to his drawing process, and a field trip to Vasari Classic Oils Colors to discuss of all of the paints on David’s palette and their properties and history with Gail Spiegel, Vasari's color expert.
