= MRHS =

MRHS may refer to:

== United States high schools ==
- Mount Rainier High School, Des Moines, Washington
- Mountain Ridge High School (Maryland), Frostburg, Maryland
- Mountain Ridge High School (Arizona), Glendale, Arizona
- Mountain Ridge High School (Utah), Herriman, Utah
- Manchester Regional High School, Haledon, New Jersey
- Marriotts Ridge High School, Marriottsville, Maryland
- Minnechaug Regional High School, Wilbraham, Massachusetts
- Monmouth-Roseville High School, Monmouth, Illinois
- Mesa Ridge High School, Colorado Springs, Colorado

== Other uses ==
- Member of the Royal Horticultural Society
