= USC Shoah Foundation =

Nonprofit organization

USC Shoah Foundation – The Institute for Visual History and Education
- Founded: April 12, 1994; 32 years ago by Steven Spielberg in the United States
- Type: Research and Education Institute
- Headquarters: University of Southern California
- Location: Los Angeles, California
- Chief Executive Officer: Dr. Robert Williams
- Board Chair: Melinda Goldrich
- Website: sfi.usc.edu

The USC Shoah Foundation – The Institute for Visual History and Education, formerly Survivors of the Shoah Visual History Foundation, is a nonprofit organization dedicated to making audio-visual interviews with survivors and witnesses of the Holocaust (which in Hebrew is called the Shoah). It was established by Steven Spielberg in 1994, one year after completing his Academy Award-winning film Schindler's List. The concept was to videotape the testimony of Holocaust survivors "before it was too late". Over 50,000 survivors were interviewed in the initial period from 1994-1999. In January 2006, the foundation partnered with and relocated to the University of Southern California (USC) and was renamed the USC Shoah Foundation – The Institute for Visual History and Education. In March 2019, the institute opened their new global headquarters on USC's campus.

The Survivors of the Shoah Visual History Foundation was founded by director Steven Spielberg in 1994 after the release of his critically-acclaimed film Schindler's List the previous year. Spielberg's goal was to collect 50,000 testimonies of Holocaust survivors while meeting the standards of rigorous scholarship. The foundation consulted with Holocaust scholars and oral histories in order to ground its work in historical scholarship.

The Shoah Foundation followed the work of the Fortunoff Archive, founded in 1979 partly in response to the 1978 television miniseries Holocaust. In 2006, the foundation, moved from its home in a set of trailers at Universal Studios to the libraries of the University of Southern California. It was renamed the USC Shoah Foundation—The Institute for Visual History and Education.

== Visual History Archive ==
The foundation's testimonies are preserved in a digital Visual History Archive. The archive include over 55,000 Holocaust testimonials and in the last few years has added testimony from survivors and witnesses of other genocides, including the Rwandan genocide, the Nanjing Massacre, Armenian genocide, Guatemalan genocide, Cambodian genocide, Rohingya genocide and the Bosnian genocide, as well as a collection of contemporary Antisemitism. In December 2023, the foundation launched a collection of testimonies from the 2023 Hamas-led attack on Israel in cooperation with Tablet Studios. Its collections include:

- Audio-Visual Testimony: The foundation conducted nearly 52,000 video testimonies between 1994 and 1999, and currently has more than 55,000. Most relate to the Holocaust, primarily those of Jewish survivors, rescuers and aid-providers, Sinti and Roma survivors, liberators, political prisoners, Jehovah's Witness survivors, war crimes trial participants, eugenic policies survivors, Non-Jewish forced laborers and homosexual survivors. The archive expanded in 2013 to include testimonies of Tutsi survivors of the Rwandan genocide and has further expanded to include interviews with survivors of other genocides, including the Armenian genocide, Cambodian genocide, Guatemalan genocide, Nanjing Massacre in China, and the current Rohingya genocide in Myanmar. The vast majority of the testimonies contain a complete personal history of life before, during, and after the interviewee's first-hand experience with genocide.
- Testimony in Current Conflict: In an effort to "intervene in the cycle that leads to genocide", the foundation conducts testimony interviews in conflict zones with witnesses to pre-genocidal and genocidal violence. Experience groups have included witnesses in South Sudan (2015) and the Central African Republic (2016), Rohingya refugees in Myanmar (2017), and refugees and internally displaced persons in Northern Syria (2019–2020).

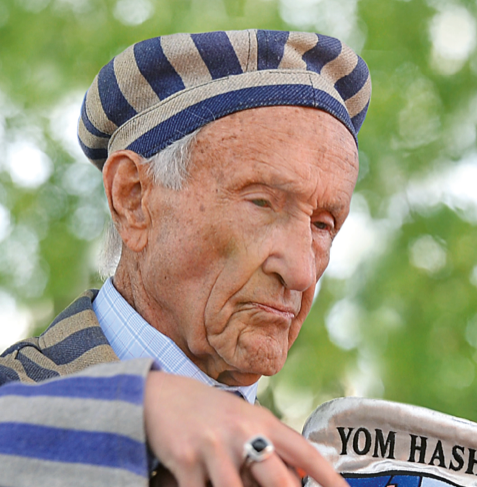
Edward Mosberg

- Dimensions in Testimony: Dimensions in Testimony is a collection of 71 genocide survivor and witness testimonies, conducted using volumetric capture techniques in order to create 3D interactive video biographies and standard video capture techniques. Included were interviews of, among others, Eva Kor, Edward Mosberg, Eva Schloss, and Peng Zhuying. The resulting experience enables users to engage in real-time conversation with witnesses to historical events.
- Testimony on Location: Testimony on Location, began in 2019 to interview Holocaust survivors in the physical locations of their pre-war and wartime experiences using 360 capture technology. These allow the viewer to stand virtually in the location where a survivor's story happened as they hear a survivor's firsthand account of experiences from childhood, ghettos, concentration camps, and liberation.
- Physical Collections: In addition to the audio-visual testimonies, holocaust and genocide studies collection recently acquired by USC's Doheny Library contains more than 1,000 original Nazi books and pamphlets, Jewish publications, microfilms with original documents such as Nazi newspapers and a nearly complete series of original transcripts of the International Nuremberg trials. Also included in the Doheny collection: early Holocaust historiography; early post-war publications of diaries and testimonies in various languages; and original papers of German and Austrian refugees from the Third Reich, including the German-Jewish writer Lion Feuchtwanger.
- Art: A major permanent artwork was commissioned as the centrepiece of the global headquarters on USC's campus, Los Angeles. ‘Remembering Our Father’s Words’ (2018) by British sculptor Nicola Anthony is a stainless steel text sculpture sponsored by the Goldrich Family Foundation, which incorporates Holocaust survivor Jona Goldrich’s testimony.
- Holocaust survivor Edward Mosberg was the subject of a painting by artist David Kassan that appeared in September–December 2019 in an exhibition co-curated by the USC Shoah Foundation and USC’s Fisher Museum of Art, named "Facing Survival."

The Survivors of the Shoah Visual History Foundation was founded by director Steven Spielberg in 1994 after the release of his critically-acclaimed film Schindler's List the previous year. Spielberg's goal was to collect 50,000 testimonies of Holocaust survivors while meeting the standards of rigorous scholarship. The foundation consulted with Holocaust scholars and oral histories in order to ground its work in historical scholarship.

The Shoah Foundation followed the work of the Fortunoff Archive, founded in 1979 partly in response to the 1978 television miniseries Holocaust. In 2006, the foundation, moved from its home in a set of trailers at Universal Studios to the libraries of the University of Southern California. It was renamed the USC Shoah Foundation—The Institute for Visual History and Education.

In 2014, the Shoah Foundation established the USC Shoah Foundation Center for Advanced Genocide Research to expand its documentation efforts to other genocides, such as the Rwandan genocide, Armenian genocide, and Cambodian genocide.

By 2016, the foundation's archive included nearly 52,000 recordings and was the largest collection of audiovisual testimonies of any kind.

In the 2020s, the foundation expanded its mission from the Holocaust to focus on antisemitism since 1945, as there were fewer Holocaust survivors to interview. The foundation planned to gather testimonies on the expulsion of Jews from Arab countries after 1948 and Ethiopian Jews.

Eight days after the October 7 attacks on Israel, researchers from the Shoah Foundation were in southern Israel to gather survivor testimonies after recognizing the attack as a "mass act of violence against Jews." Within a year, the foundation had recorded 400 testimonies of survivors, first responders, and eyewitnesses, with 370 online. The foundation also advised the National Library of Israel about how to create a collection of records.

== Research ==
The foundation continues to incorporate new collections of genocide eyewitness testimonies while also fostering scholarly activities that confront real-world problems the testimonies address. Scholars in many fields have utilized the resources of the Visual History Archive to teach more than 400 university courses across four continents, including 112 courses at USC.

The Center for Advanced Genocide Research is the research and scholarship unit of the foundation. Founded in 2014, the center engages in interdisciplinary research on the Holocaust and genocide, more specifically the origins of genocide and how to intervene in the cycle that leads to mass violence. It holds international conferences and workshops and hosts fellows and scholars in residence to conduct research using the resources available at the University of Southern California. Institute fellows, staff and student interns participate in more than a dozen academic events on the USC campus annually. it focusses on interdisciplinary study organized around three themes: "Resistance to Genocide and Mass Violence" focuses on acts of resistance and elements of defiance that slow down or stop genocidal processes. "Violence, Emotion and Behavioral Change" studies the nature of genocide and mass violence and how they impact emotional, social, psychological, historical and physical behavior.

The foundation, in conjunction with its Center for Advanced Genocide Research, held an international conference in November 2014 at USC "Memory, Media and Technology: Exploring the Trajectories of Schindler's List". In 2015, in collaboration with the Thornton School of Music and USC Visions and Voices, it hosted the international conference "Singing in the Lion's Mouth: Music as Resistance to Violence", including two days of programming that highlighted the use of music as a tool to resist oppression and spread awareness.

== Education ==
The foundation's education programs include:

- Teaching with Testimony in the 21st Century – A two-year development program to help educators to use testimony and digital learning tools such as IWitness in their learning environments
- ITeach – A one-day seminar that includes an introduction to USC Shoah Foundation's educational programs, the Visual History Archive, methodology, social psychology and pedagogical theory, and the introduction of a testimony-based lesson.
- IWalks – An interactive education program that connects the Visual History Archive and other primary sources, to physical locations with memories of historical events that took place on these locations in several European cities. IWalks have been created in Budapest, Hungary; Prague in the Czech Republic; and Warsaw, Poland
- Echoes and Reflections – A Holocaust-focused multimedia development program providing secondary teachers in the United States with Holocaust information about European Jews in continental Europe for their classrooms.

== Global access ==
The complete Visual History Archive is available at 49 institutions around the world, while smaller collections are available at 199 sites in 33 countries. Approximately 1.6 million people view the testimonies every year.

George W. Schaeffer, whose foundation funded access to the Visual History Archive played a key role in expanding its reach.

In 2015, the foundation added Global Outreach as its fourth organizational pillar. Global Outreach is conducted through websites, documentaries, and exhibits, as well as national and international press coverage about its programs; and shared media on social platforms.

- The foundation and Comcast launched a five-year partnership in 2014 to annually bring programming over the course of seven weeks in the spring, commemorating Genocide Awareness Month. Each year, the series is themed with a feature film anchoring the program offerings. The 2015 theme, Music, was anchored by The Pianist and introduced by actor Adrien Brody, who won an Oscar for his role in the film.
- In 2017, the foundation initiated a campaign called #strongerthanhate in order to provide teachers, parents and community leaders educational tools to "help confront the seeds of hate".
- In 2020, the foundation collaborated with Liberation 75 and partnered on “Stories are Stronger than Hate: A Call to Action” Student Program. The virtual broadcast was hosted by actor/director, Mike Myers, with guest, former NHL player Akim Aliu. with a total of 22 countries tuning in, approx. 1,500 students from 260 schools took part. The broadcast featured Holocaust survivor, Pinchas Gutter and other participants, giving testimony, discussing personal stories and introducing lessons from the Holocaust, in an effort to bring understanding to students.
