= March of the Living Digital Archive Project =

Archive repository of film from MOTL

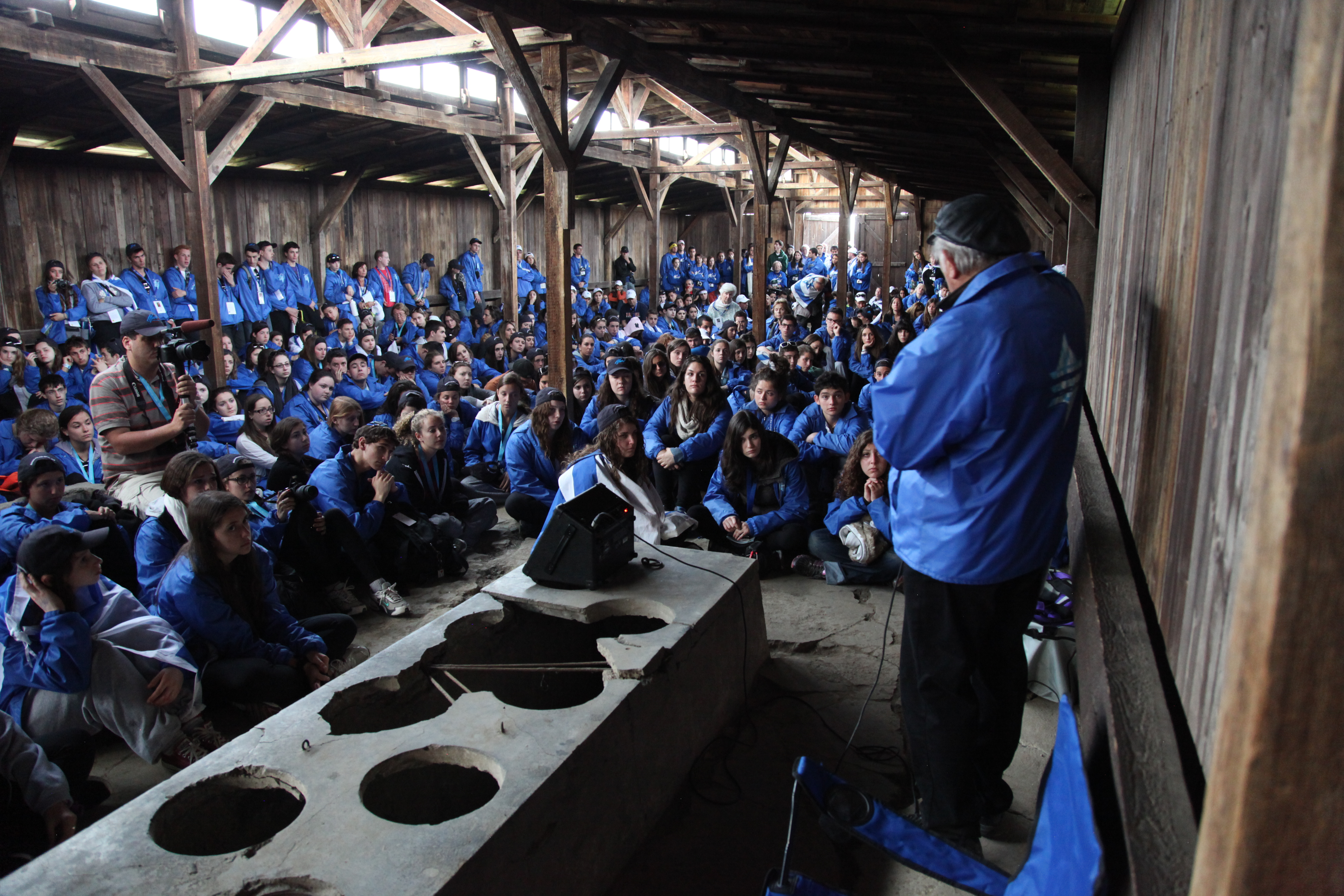
Holocaust Survivor Nate Liepciger speaking to students in Auschwitz-Birkenau

The March of the Living Digital Archive Project (MOLDAP) was established in 2013 to collect, catalog, and preserve Holocaust survivor testimonies recorded during annual March of the Living educational trips, which began in 1988. The archive is intended to preserve Holocaust survivor testimonies associated with the March of the Living and to support Holocaust education initiatives. Through firsthand accounts recorded at historical sites connected to the Holocaust, the MOL Digital Archive provides material for examining broader historical and social themes, including antisemitism, racism, and genocide. The collection is made available as an online, on-demand resource for educational and research use.

MOLDAP is an ongoing digital archive/repository of international Holocaust survivor testimony produced in a multitude of mediums, some of which are technologically advanced and filmed in partnership with the USC Shoah Foundation in locations where specific Holocaust survivors' stories began. The archive also features short documentaries, vignettes, and full-length films & stories.

== History ==
The pilot project was initiated in 2013 by Evan Zelikovitz, serving as Chair, Eli Rubenstein, as Director and Naomi Wise as Producer. This period centred on Canadian Holocaust survivors and footage, which was later labelled, Stage 1 of 3.

Stage 1 of the project focused on identifying, collecting, and consolidating unedited/raw footage recorded during March of the Living programs since its inception 1988. This material was sourced from Canada and other participating countries and to be organized into a centralized digital archive.

The footage was labeled, categorized, and backed up for long-term preservation. Metadata was created to enable search and retrieval by year, geographic location, survivor name, age, subject matter, theme, videographer, and participating delegation, including national contingents and related programs such as the March of Remembrance and Hope.

Stage 1 also included the production of short documentary films drawn from the archived footage, each focusing on the life stories and experiences of individual Holocaust survivors. A dedicated website was developed to host and present these films.

=== Stage 2 ===
In 2018, the International March of the Living, in collaboration with the USC Shoah Foundation, launched a second phase of the project that expanded the archive through on-location filming of Holocaust survivors using immersive media technologies. Survivor testimonies recorded during this initiative were produced in three distinct formats:

1. 360 On-Location consists of 360-degree video recordings of North American Holocaust survivors filmed at sites associated with their Holocaust experiences, situating testimony within relevant historical locations.
2. IWALK is a location-based mobile app that uses GPS technology to provide access to 360-degree survivor testimonies connected to specific sites while users are visiting those locations.
3. Travelogue is a collection of edited footage documenting Holocaust survivors revisiting historical sites in Poland during the March of the Living, capturing site-based reflections and personal recollections.

The project uses 360-degree video technology to record survivor testimony on location, capturing both the subject and surrounding environment in a single continuous shot. In some cases, photogrammetry is employed to collect thousands of high-resolution images for digital reconstruction of physical spaces. These digitally captured assets support immersive formats such as virtual and augmented reality and are designed for integration into interactive educational platforms, including IWalks.

Holocaust survivors, Max Eisen, Ben Finkel, Ben Lesser, Max Glauben, Johnny Jablon, Gabriella Karin, Eva Kuper, Bill Lewkowict, Edward Mosberg, Tova Rogenstein, and Marcel Zielinski were all featured or appear in one or more of the above-listed stage 2 items.

=== Stage 3 ===
Launched in 2019, the March of the Living Holocaust Survivor Vignettes Project is an ongoing initiative that presents a series of short video testimonies recorded during March of the Living visits to Poland, featuring survivor testimony shared with students at historical sites connected to the Holocaust.

The recordings draw on material documented during March of the Living programs over approximately two decades and include testimonies from Holocaust survivors Amek Adler, Hedy Bohm, Anita Ekstein, Ernest Ehrman, Bill Glied, Pinchas Gutter, Nate Liepciger, Henry Melnick, Georgine Nash, Stefania Sitbon, Ernie Weiss, and Helen Yermus. The footage was filmed and edited by Canadian-Israeli filmmaker Igal Hecht and Toronto-based filmmaker Naomi Wise. The project has a goal of continuously expanding.

== Testimony and Technology ==
As immersive media becomes increasingly central to education and communication, and the number of living Holocaust survivors declines, USC Shoah Foundation has developed a method for recording 360-degree video testimony on location to permanently preserve survivor memories and experiences in connection to their geographic locations. USCSF found that this technique of recording testimony on location brings forward memories on-the-spot that might otherwise be missed in traditional interview-style recording. For the educational purposes, USC SF also noted that the immersive experience of a full environmental shot/scene can help viewers connect meaning with the Holocaust survivor's story. The 360-degree filming is done using a single camera and new technology, which can be exported for use in their IWALK app.

International March of the Living Chairman, Dr. Shmuel Rosenman affirmed that these testimonies ensure survivors' experiences remain central to future March of the Living programs long after they can no longer attend in person. Eli Rubenstein, Director of Education for International March of the Living mentioned that adopting these new digital approaches, it's reshaping how Holocaust stories and lessons are shared with audiences worldwide.

=== 360° testimony project ===
In Holocaust XR: Immersive Technologies as the Last Act of Testimony, Stephen D. Smith identifies the International March of the Living as the first programmatic partner of USC Shoah Foundation’s 360° Testimony on Location initiative. The partnership sought to preserve survivor testimony recorded at Holocaust sites for future educational use. Proposed applications included documentaries, biographical films and short testimony clips that students could access while visiting the locations where they were filmed.

Eli Rubenstein said its involvement was influenced by participant surveys indicating that meeting Holocaust survivors was among the most meaningful parts of March of the Living trips. The project was therefore intended to preserve a form of survivor presence for future participants after survivors are no longer able to accompany them.

== Documentaries and Films ==
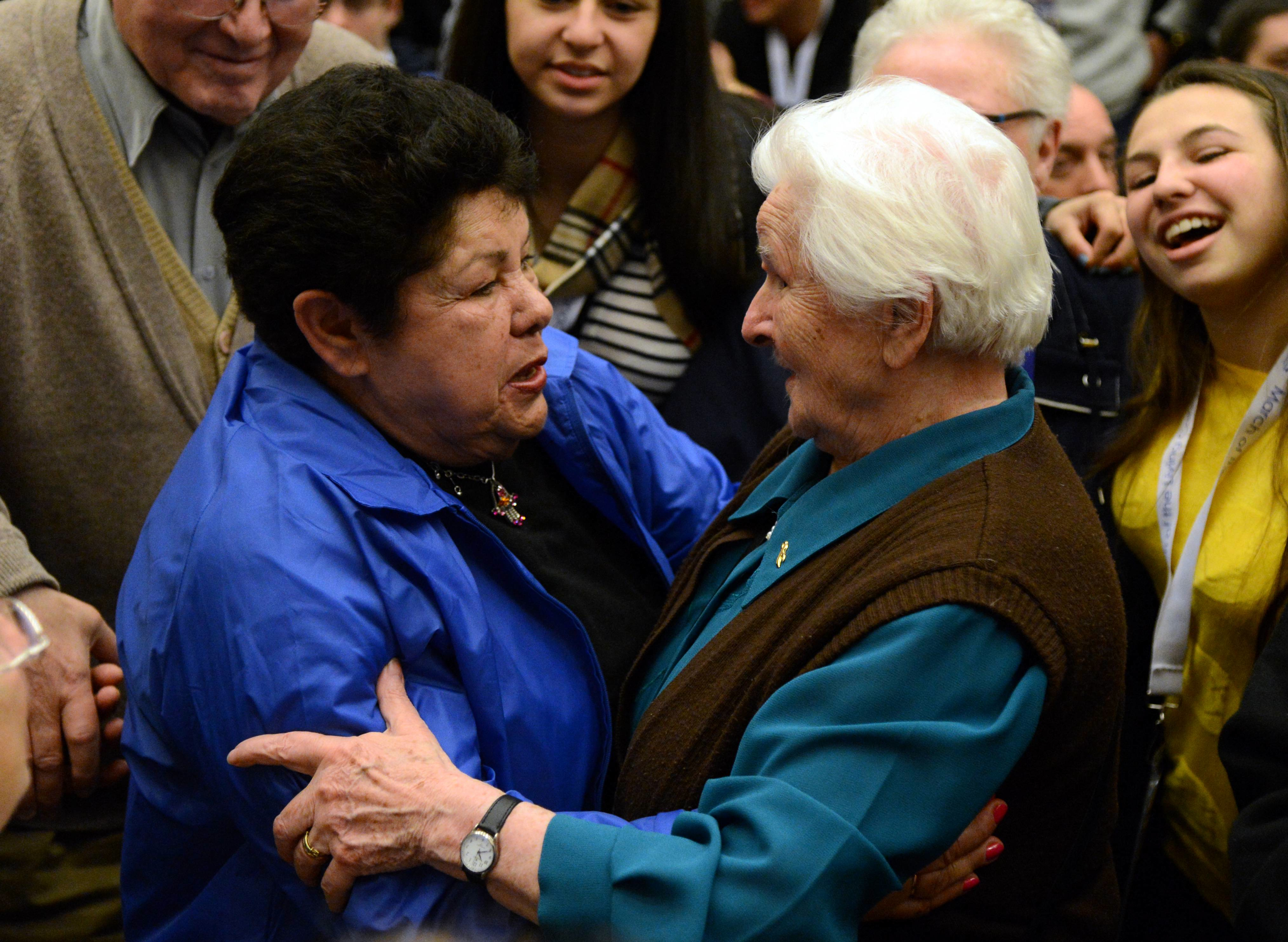
Czeslawa Zak embraces Holocaust survivor Miriam Zakrojczyk on the March of the Living

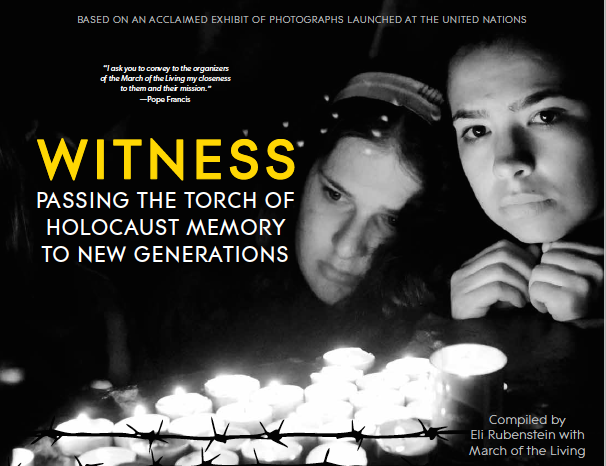
Book Cover: Witness: Passing the Torch of Holocaust Memory to New Generations

Twice Liberated: 88-year-old Holocaust survivor Joe Mandel unexpectedly reunites with his World War II liberator Mickey Dorsey on the 2012 March of the Living. The film premiered at the opening of the March of the Living Exhibit at the United Nations (When You Listen to a Witness You Become a Witness) on Tuesday, 28 January 2014.

Reunions: Polish Holocaust survivor Sidney Zoltak returns to his hometown of Siemiatycze in northeast Poland to thank the Polish rescuer who saved him from Nazis. Screened at the Hamilton Jewish, Vancouver Jewish, and the Big Sky Documentary film festivals.

Blind Love: A Holocaust Journey to Poland with Man's Best Friend: This documentary follows six blind Israelis traveling to Poland with the help of their guide dogs, to learn about the Holocaust. see Wikipedia page for more information.

Auschwitz-Birkenau: 70 Years After Liberation..A Warning to Future Generations: In January 2015, on the eve of the 70th anniversary of the liberation Auschwitz-Birkenau, five Canadian Auschwitz survivors - along with participants in the March of the Living - recall their experiences in Auschwitz-Birkenau and the lessons to be reminded of on this historic date.

The film premiered at the 70th anniversary commemorations of the liberation of Auschwitz-Birkenau on January 27, 2015, at a ceremony on Parliament Hill, in Ottawa, Canada, and was attended by politicians, dignitaries and community representatives.

Czeslawa & Olga

Polish Righteous Among the Nations Czeslawa Zak reunites with one of the people she rescued, Olga Kost, in Israel for the last time, fulfilling one of her life's dreams

The film is shown yearly at the University of Warsaw in a ceremony honoring the Righteous Among the Nations, to an audience of about 1,000 attending the annual March of the Living

Witness: Passing the Torch of Holocaust Memory to New Generations

In addition to the films produced, several March of the Living Digital Archive videos figure prominently in Witness: Passing the Torch of Holocaust Memory to New Generations and the related exhibit (which appeared at the United Nations and the Auschwitz-Birkenau State Museum.) The book and exhibit have incorporated an interactive aspect where the featured survivors, World War II liberators, and Righteous Among the Nations, include an invisible link embedded on their image. When their image is accessed with a smart phone or other device, the viewer is taken to an excerpt of their video testimony on the March of the Living Digital Archives websites or the USC Shoah Foundation Institute for Visual History and Education (created by Steven Spielberg)

== See Also ==
- Nate Leipciger
- Eli Rubenstein
- Elly Gotz
- March of the Living
