= Elly Gotz =

Holocaust Survivor, Educator & Author

Elly (Lasar) Gotz CM
- Born: March 8, 1928 (age 98); Kaunas, Lithuania
- Occupations: Engineer, Holocaust educator, public speaker, author
- Spouse: Esme Cohen
- Honours: Order of Canada (Dec 31, 2025)
- Website: https://www.ellygotz.com

Elly (Lasar) Gotz C.M. OC BSc (born March 8, 1928) is a Lithuanian-born Holocaust survivor, engineer, entrepreneur, businessperson, pilot, author, educator, and public speaker. When Nazi Germany invaded Lithuania during the Second World War, he and his family were confined to the Kovno ghetto in Kaunas before being deported to Germany. In 1944, Gotz was sent to Dachau concentration camp, where he was subjected to forced labor until his liberation by American forces on April 29, 1945. After the war, he lived in several countries before immigrating to Canada in 1964. Since 1996, Gotz has shared his Holocaust experiences around the world through Holocaust education and remembrance initiatives, including in high schools, universities, and speaking to groups participating in the March of the Living and the March of Remembrance and Hope. In December 2025, at the age of 97, Elly Gotz was appointed a member of the Order of Canada. He has three children, six grandchildren, and three great-grandchildren.

== Early life ==
Elly Gotz was born in Kaunas, Lithuania in 1928 to Sonja and Judel Gotz. His mother Sonja, worked as a surgical nurse and his father Judel sas a bookkeeper. Gotz was an only child and attended a Yiddish school in Lithuania. An Azrieli Foundation education exhibit about Gotz describes him as a child who loved learning, and includes a memoir excerpt about a favourite children's book (in Yiddish, with colourful illustrations) that his father gave him before 1939. There are limited records that place Gotz and his family on vacation in Kulautuva in the mid-1930s. A later account of his story notes that in 1941, at age 13, he had just received a new school uniform and was excited to start the next grade, when the German occupation closed all Jewish schools.

== World War II ==
Gotz and his parents were imprisoned in the Kaunas ghetto after the German occupation, where he and approximately 30,000 Jews were locked up for almost three years. Gotz described life in the ghetto as systematic dehumanization, including the confiscation of property, forced labor, overcrowding, hunger, and the constant threat of violence.

Being initially too young for forced labour, Gotz attended a ghetto trade school, where he trained as a toolmaker, later instructing other children. Over his three-year period in the Kaunas ghetto, Gotz witnessed systematic confiscation of property and mass deportations. Later in life, he recalled witnessing large-scale executions, including the murder of approximately 10,000 men, women, and children at the Ninth Fort on October 29, 1941, later called the Kaunas massacre.

By 1944, the ghetto population had been reduced to approximately 8,000 individuals. During a German search operation that summer, Gotz described a period during that operation in which he and several family members were in hiding in a basement during the German occupation. The group included his parents, three uncles, and an aunt. To conceal the space, they blocked the entrance with a cupboard and remained inside while monitoring sounds from outside, aware that discovery would likely have resulted in their arrest or death. His mother being a nurse, had prepared a contingency plan in the event of discovery - a collective suicide by injections she had prepared on a tray. in his own words, Gotz describes this as the most dramatic even in his life: "On this day, death would come not from the hand of an enemy - it would come from the hand of my beloved mother."

Gotz volunteered to die first, explaining later, “I [didn't] want to see my family die.” While Gotz and his parents avoided discovery at that time, they were later deported by cattle car to concentration camps.

=== Dachau ===
His mother was deported to Stutthof, while Gotz and his father were deported to Kaufering, Dachau camp #1 in the Dachau concentration camp system. There they were forced to work 12-hour days with minimal rations in a German industrial facility involved in the construction of a large underground factory, intended on producing the first jet fighter plane. A project that was never completed. “If a potato floated in the soup it was a good day,” Gotz recalled in an interview. “No meat, no fat, nothing, and one slice of bread for the whole day. So we starved.” Conditions in the camp were extreme, marked by starvation, disease, and systematic brutality, resulting in the deaths of one third of the prisoners. Gotz later obtained an indoor work assignment, which reduced exposure to extreme weather conditions. During interviews, he stated that a supervisor occasionally provided additional food when he was assigned work at a pump station.

Camp authorities made it clear to inmates that survival was not expected. Gotz remembers a Commandant saying, "we keep the last bullet for you." At times, he had to assist in removing bodies. In later speaking engagements long after the war, he explained, “I got used to carrying dead bodies.”

As the war drew to a close, the remaining prisoners were transferred to the main camp at Dachau, which was severely overcrowded and suffering from catastrophic conditions. When Gotz arrived at the main camp, his father was with him, and was near death from starvation and illness. His father was placed in a bunk that had just been vacated by a deceased prisoner and continued to weaken.

=== Liberation ===
American forces liberated Dachau on April 29, 1945, shortly after Gotz's 17th birthday. Upon hearing the news, his father appeared to already have lost the will to live. Later during speaking engagements, Gotz illustrated how powerful starvation affects the mind and spirit. Standing in line waiting for his ration of soup and bread for him and his father, Gotz learned that American troops had entered the camp to liberate it. In an interview with the March of the Living Digital Archive Project, Gotz described their moment of liberation: “So, four o’clock, on the 29th of April, I'm in line. I pick up the soup for myself and I say, this is for him, and they gave me another bowl of soup for my father and another piece of bread. And I'm going to him, and he takes the soup, and at that moment, prisoners are shouting, ‘The Americans are here, we are free!’ I told my father, ‘Father, the Americans are here, we are free! The war is over!’ So, he looks at me with that faraway look, and he says, ‘That's good. Have you got the bread?’ That was my moment of liberation.”

Gotz later described liberation as the end of a nightmare and the beginning of a new life. Although he did not have direct contact with American soldiers, he witnessed the reaction of fellow prisoners and expressed lasting gratitude to the American army for their role in liberating the camp and contributing to the defeat of Nazi Germany. Throughout his imprisonment, he maintained a belief, grounded in his understanding of Jewish history, that the Nazi regime would ultimately be defeated. Gotz weighed 70 pounds on liberation day.

Speaking to Western University students, Gotz emphasized that survival depended on a combination of factors, including chance, physical endurance, and having skills that could be exploited by the camp authorities. Gotz described how prisoners who lost the will to survive often died quickly, while those who maintained a sense of purpose or usefulness stood a greater chance of enduring the conditions. Gotz highlighted the psychological impact of imprisonment, mentioning a constant presence of violence, arbitrary punishment, and the knowledge that prisoners were considered disposable. He characterized the Dachau system as an environment designed not only to extract labor but to systematically strip inmates of dignity and humanity, making survival an ongoing struggle rather than a passive condition.

Gotz spent approximately six months recovering in hospital and was later reunited with his mother. It was there he experienced intense anger toward Germans and sought revenge. Gotz has spoken and written about these intense feelings during this time. He describes a turning point in which he reconsidered the moral implications of collective blame. “I gave [the hate] up,” he said. “I realized you can't hate the whole people for what some of them have done. And when I gave up that hate, I started living for the first time.” His mother had survived imprisonment at the Stutthof concentration camp. “I was the only [patient] who had both parents,” Gotz said. “I didn't tell anybody. I was embarrassed by how lucky I was.”

== Post-war ==
After WWII, the Gotz family first lived in Germany before emigrating to Norway in 1947. Later that year, the family moved to Zimbabwe (then Southern Rhodesia) to join relatives where Gotz continued his studies and graduated with a Bachelor of Science in engineering from the University of the Witwatersrand in Johannesburg, South Africa. While living there, he founded businesses in the entertainment and sound/recording sectors and later worked in the leather and plastics industries.

He married Esme Cohen in 1958, and in 1964 the couple, with their three children, immigrated to Toronto, Canada where he worked as an entrepreneur, he managed factories, and educator.

In 1985 Esme Gotz founded a private vocational school for individuals who dropped out or did not complete school and were looking to learn job skills. in 1979, she started a school for people with learning challenges, to teach basic life skills called, The Springfield School for Girls. Later, Esme Gotz owned a franchise of the Toronto School of Business, opening a campus in Oshawa, and later Pickering and Coburg.

Gotz became a frequent speaker on Holocaust history and antisemitism and did educational trips to Auschwitz for students over many years. Participant feedback has often identified his testimony as a significant component of these programs.

He has also commented publicly on contemporary antisemitism, stating, “I've never seen anything like it,” in reference to recent trends in Canada during 2025.

In his speaking, Gotz has emphasized the consequences of hatred. “It's one of the failures of humanity that we hate,” he said. “As an engineer, I'm so conscious of all the achievements of humanity. But when we hate, we produce nothing.”

=== Aviation and skydiving ===
He became a private pilot, instrument-rated pilot, and glider pilot. Gotz developed an interest in aviation, and in 1971 Gotz and purchased a single-engine Piper Comanche. He had resumed his flight training in 1968 and received his first Pilot license in 1969. in 1975 he earned his Instrument Rating, allowing him to fly through cloud coverage at night, flew his family to Florida, and was able to fly himself between Canada and the United States on business trips. Later, after selling his plane, he took up flying gliders

In 2017, Gotz made his first tandem skydive in Ontario. The jump was widely covered by Canadian media and was undertaken as a personal milestone rather than a fundraising or promotional event. Gotz stated that the experience reflected his approach to life following the Holocaust, emphasizing resilience, gratitude, and the importance of continuing to engage fully with the world.

Gotz, skydiving to mark his 90th birthday, described the jump as an affirmation of survival and personal freedom, noting that fear had played a defining role in his early life and that confronting it voluntarily held personal meaning. Media coverage highlighted the contrast between his wartime experiences and his continued willingness to pursue physically demanding activities in advanced age.

Gotz has spoken about aviation and skydiving in the context of survival, agency, and recovery after trauma, presenting these activities as personal expressions rather than symbolic gestures. His experiences have been referenced in educational and commemorative settings as part of broader discussions on post-war life among Holocaust survivors.

== Public speaking ==
Gotz has spoken frequently in schools and universities (in-person and online via Zoom) about his experience with the Holocaust and his post-war life, and his memoir, "Flights of Spirits" is a permanent written form of that testimony, published by the Azrieli Foundation's Holocaust Survival Memoirs Program in 2018. He has also provided video testimony several times in the last four decades. Gotz is known as a powerful speaker, as mentioned by Eli Rubenstein in his lecture, Ten Universal Lessons of the Holocaust.

In a talk delivered to university students during the March of Remembrance and Hope study trip to Germany and Poland, Gotz shared an experience from the 1960s in which a German business associate admitted having voluntarily joined the Hitler Youth despite his father's objections. Gotz used the encounter to illustrate how young people can be drawn into destructive movements through charisma and idealism, emphasizing the importance of critical thinking, ethical responsibility, and caution toward political leaders who claim absolute authority.

During National Holocaust Education Week on November 7, 2025, Gotz spoke to grades 10 and 11 students in London, England, sharing stories of his experience in the Holocaust, and also his hopes were to share stories of his growth since, to help show students the importance of "letting go of hate." There is a greater impact when students hear directly from Holocaust Survivors than reading general classroom materials. This greater impact was described by Grade 8 students, November 11, 2024, when Gotz gave a talk in London, Ontario. Although the 3,000 Thames Valley District School board students listened and watched via video conference, students quoted the experience as, "jaw-dropping...you don't really have words for it.," hearing about Gotz plucked from a Jewish ghetto in Lithuania and thrust into a life of forced labour in the concentration camps of Germany.

=== March of the Living & March of Remembrance and Hope ===
Gotz spoke to students in advance of their participation in the March of the Living, an annual trip bringing students to Poland and Israel, where Holocaust Survivors share their experiences with the students. Gotz was interviewed by the March of the Living Digital Archive Project and appears in the March of the Living publication, Witness: Passing the Torch of Holocaust Memory to New Generations. In 2013, Gotz shared his liberation story, giving testimony to the March of the Living about he and his father's experience as liberation day approached. He said, "I felt sad because I knew the war is over, or the war will be over very soon - either they will kills us or we will be free'd." Gotz also illustrated the attitude of Nazi guards by mentioning that when Gotz was feeling hopeful of the war concluding, the Commandant assured him that they (the Nazis) saved the last bullet for "you" (meaning the remaining Jews).

Gotz has also participated on the March of Remembrance and Hope (MRH) student program to Germany and Poland in 2016, 2018, and 2019. In 2016, participants created a photo book where they commented on their appreciation of his involvement, sharing his experiences by saying, "You've helped us understand that hope is eternal. How despite such terrible and cold darkness, you were still able to see light during your time in Dachau."

=== Messages to Young People ===
On The Current, Gotz, now in his late 90s, shared how he is amazed by the variety of experiences in his life. In the last 22 years, he estimates he has spoken to over 250,000 people; he hopes that at least some will carry forward his lessons and help create a more humane world. As of 2026, Gotz disclosed speaking for 70 engagements per year. Gotz aims his messages to young people struggling, and stresses that how one starts in life doesn't determine where one ends up. He describes his survival as largely an accident of fate, with only about 3% of Lithuanian Jews surviving. He stated his efforts are to "share lifelong learning and hope," knowing that the world comes with its challenges, Gotz was quoted that day saying, “What is it with the world? We are so smart… but we can't live with each other. That's the problem. That is why I work so hard to talk to people, to young people, to give it up.”

During the interview, Gotz emphasized that his educational work is not focused on recounting his personal suffering but on explaining the destructive effects of hatred. He described how hatred fueled the Holocaust and argued that similar patterns of dehumanization persist in modern society. He frequently shares a parable about two wolves, one representing love and compassion, the other hatred and bitterness, to illustrate the idea that individuals shape their moral character through their choices.

Gotz reflected on his postwar journey, including his decision to renounce hatred after realizing it prevented him from rebuilding his life. He explained that abandoning hatred allowed him to pursue education, ultimately becoming an engineer despite limited formal schooling, and later to write his autobiography, Gotz maintained that hatred is pointless because it harms the person who holds it, obstructs personal growth, and perpetuates cycles of violence, whereas compassion and understanding make survival, recovery, and a meaningful life possible.

== Memoir ==
At the age of 80, Gotz authored a memoir titled Flights of Spirit. The book was launched on November 7, 2018, during the Neuberger Holocaust Education Week, in partnership with the Azrieli Foundation's Holocaust Survivor Memoirs Program. Renowned Holocaust scholar, Dr. Robert Jan van Pelt, participated in the launch discussion. The memoir recounts his survival, including hiding in the bunker, ghetto life, deportation, labor camp suffering, and post-war rebirth and is available in print and audio formats on multiple platforms.

In press articles, Gotz reflects on encounters with modern hatred, including reactions to incidents like the Pittsburgh synagogue shooting. Gotz also shares personal achievements such as his skydiving at age 89, tied symbolically to Canada's 150th anniversary.

== Recognition ==
In December 2025, at the age of 97, Gotz was appointed membership to the Order of Canada, one of the Canada's highest civilian honours. Gotz was recognized for his long-standing work in Holocaust education, including public speaking and the publication of his memoir, Flights of Spirit (2018). According to his Order of Canada citation, the book “speaks to the importance of understanding the conditions that bring about genocide and serves as a genuine counterweight to Holocaust deniers.” He stated that he was surprised by the appointment. “I didn't expect it,” he said in response to the notification from the Governor General's office. He is scheduled to be formally invested during a ceremony in March, 2026.
