= Sidney Zoltak =

Polish-Canadian Holocaust survivor and educator (1931–2026)

Sidney Zoltak (1931 – October 10, 2026) was a Polish-Canadian author, and Holocaust survivor and educator who was the subject of several films. He was featured on CBC in a special done by the channel.

== Early life ==
Sidney Zoltak was born in Siemiatycze, Poland in 1931. When Nazi Germany invaded Poland in the invasion that launched the Second World War, Zoltak's hometown of Siemiatycze was occupied by German troops. However under the terms of the Molotov–Ribbentrop Pact, the Soviet-German non aggression agreement, much of Poland was divided into the Soviet sphere of influence. Then a surprise invasion by Germany on June 22, 1941 saw the Germans once again occupy Siemiatycze. The town's Jews were rounded up, forced to live in a ghetto, and by November, those left alive were shipped to Treblinka.

== Film: Reunions ==
The documentary, produced in co-operation with The March of the Living Digital Archive Project, is about Zoltak's return to Poland to meet the people that saved his life. The film was screened at the Hamilton Jewish Film Festival, the Vancouver Jewish Film Festival, and the Big Sky Documentary Film Festival.

His memoir, My Silent Pledge: A Journey of Struggle, Survival and Remembrance, was published by Guernica Editions, in 2013. In his book Witness: Passing the Torch of Holocaust Memory to New Generations author Eli Rubenstein recounts a scene from the film, told in the presence of the son of his rescuer and hundreds of March of the Living student and recorded at Treblinka, where nearly one million Jews were murdered. "When we got back to our hometown, less than one percent had survived. Less than 70 from a community of 7,000. The most difficult part for me was that none of my classmates, none of my friends survived. I am the only one. I think about it. The only reunion I can have is in this place among the memorial stones," Zoltak is quoted as saying.

== Death ==
Zoltak died at his home in Montreal, on October 10, 2026, at the age of 95.

== Sources ==
- http://www.cbc.ca/news/world/montreal-man-reunites-with-polish-rescuer-who-saved-him-from-nazis-1.2662273
- http://www.cija.ca/cjhsd/
- https://www.guernicaeditions.com/title/9781550718072
- http://o.canada.com/news/holocaust-survivors-shameful-that-pier-21-not-displaying-memorial-to-victims-of-voyage-of-the-damned
- https://collections.ushmm.org/search/catalog/pa1143062
