= Shimon Farkas =

Cantor, performer, and promoter of Holocaust awareness

Shimon Farkas OAM
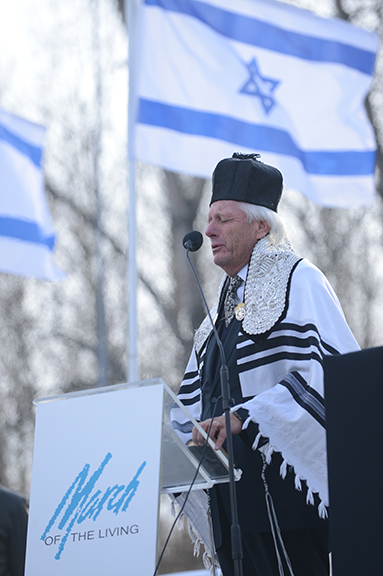
- Farkas at Auschwitz Birkenau
- Born: December 4, 1949 (age 76); Fehérgyarmat
- Education: Yeshiva University, Bar Ilan University
- Occupation: Cantor
- Years active: 1971–present
- Employer: Central Synagogue of Sydney
- Title: Chief Cantor
- Spouse: Veronica Farkas
- Children: 3

Shimon Farkas is a Hungarian cantor, singer, and performer living in Australia. He was awarded the Medal of the Order of Australia in 2008. He has served as Chief Cantor at The Central Synagogue of Sydney for over five decades, from 1971 to the present (with a ten-year hiatus).

== Early life ==
Farkas was born in Fehergyarmat, Hungary in 1949 to Holocaust survivors, Chaim Meir Farkas and Faigu Weiss. During the war, his parents survived the camps and married in Fehergyarmat after their liberation. Three of his grandparents were murdered in Auschwitz in 1944, and the fourth died prior to the war. His father was one of 5 of 8 siblings who survived the Holocaust. On his mother's side, both parents, and three of their ten children perished in Auschwitz. Farkas moved to Israel in 1951, and led a service on Friday evening at the Rama Synagogue in Tel Aviv at age 9.

Farkas and his mother immigrated to the United States in the fall of 1961, after his father's death. They lived in the Borough Park neighbourhood of Brooklyn, New York. For his musical training, he studied privately under Moshe Kusevitsky and was appointed lead soloist in Kusevitsky's choir.

== Cantorial career ==
Farkas was first posted as cantor at the Orthodox Shaarei Shomayim synagogue in 1967 for the High Holidays in Windsor, Ontario.

Farkas led High Holiday services for an Orthodox congregation in Cincinnati, Ohio in 1969 and 1970. During that time, while attending Yeshiva University in New York, he enrolled as an exchange student at Bar Ilan University in Israel, and studied under Cantor David Bagley. In Israel, he met Veronica Weisz, who was studying at Machon Gold in Jerusalem. The two were married and relocated to her hometown in Sydney, Australia.

The following year at age 22, he was appointed and served as cantor at The Central Synagogue of Sydney for 15 years. In 1987, he was engaged by the Concord Resort Hotel in the Catskills, to conduct Passover and High Holyday services, where it was noted that he filled the venue to capacity.

After the success of his performances at the Concord during each Passover and High Holidays, Farkas recorded an album called "Voices of the Concord" accompanied by the Concord Symphonic Chorale, making his debut as a composer. A record of the songs from "Voices of the Concord" are kept at the Dartmouth Jewish Sound Archive. Writing for The Australian Jewish News, David Brown reviewed the album and wrote "In a world where the art of the cantor is hardly flourishing, Farkas keeps the cantorial flag flying proudly."

In 1994, the synagogue in Sydney was damaged by fire. Farkas played a role in fundraising for the rebuilding of the synagogue and returned to his current position as Chief Cantor, when the Central Synagogue was rededicated in 1998.

Farkas has built up a notable repertoire over the course of his career, singing in seven languages, and including Broadway favorites. He performs primarily between the United States, Israel, Europe and Australia. He has appeared with Marvin Hamlisch, conducting the Calgary Symphony Orchestra and the Sydney International Orchestra when Farkas produced a concert in 2008, titled "From Broadway to Jerusalem" at the same synagogue where he served as cantor for decades, The Central Synagogue of Sydney. In the following years, Farkas and his son, Dov produced a series of gala concerts in Melbourne and Sydney called "Symphony for the Soul: A Salute to Israel," with Mordechai Sobol as conductor.

== Personal life ==
Shimon and Veronica have three children, Chaim, Mimi, and Dov. Both sons, have followed in their father's footsteps with performances and recordings with their father and on their own. In 2008, Dov was appointed Chief Cantor of the Caulfield Hebrew Congregation in Melbourne, Australia. Chaim Farkas serves as President of the Ichud Shivat Tzion congregation in Tel Aviv, and leads occasional services at Ichud Shivat Tzion.

Eden Shifroni, Farkas's granddaughter, is a soprano with the Melbourne Symphony Orchestra, and grew up watching her grandfather sing as the chazzan at Sydney’s Central Synagogue. Shifroni won the 2024 IFAC Handa Australian Singing Competition Finals, accompanied by the Opera Australia Orchestra. She also received a Ryman Healthcare Opera Scholarship with Melba Opera Trust, where students are coached in multiple languages.

== Participation In The March of the Living ==
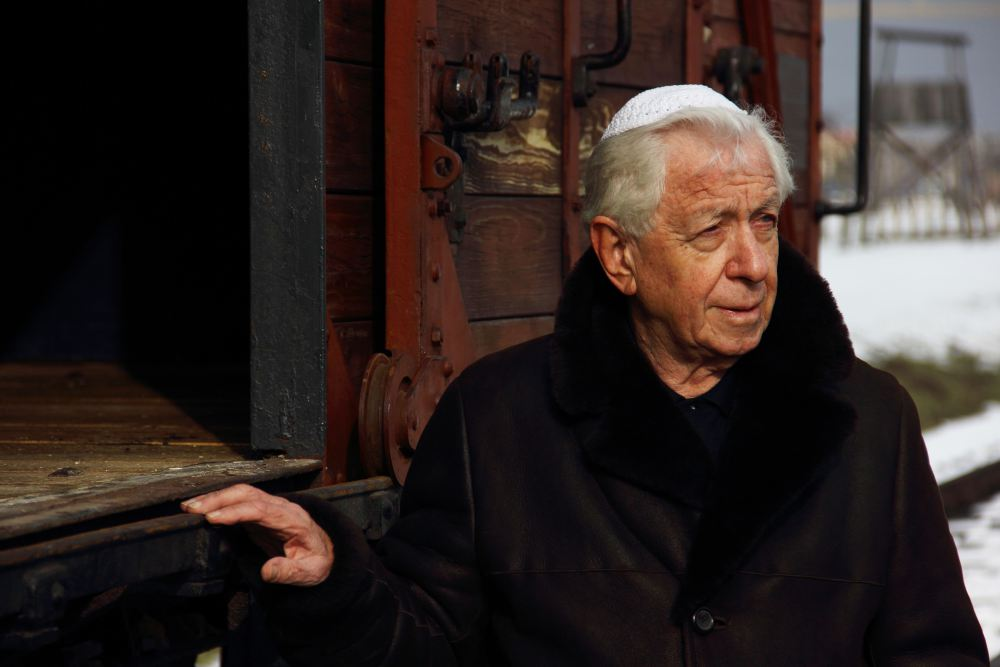
Frank Lowy at the 2013 March of the Living in Auschwitz-Birkenau in front of the cattle car he donated in memory of his father, Hugo.

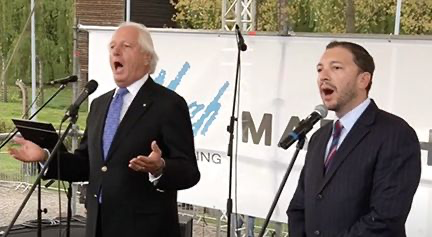
Cantor Shimon Farkas performs with his son, Chaim at Auschwitz during the March of the Living

Farkas has participated numerous times in the March of the Living in Auschwitz-Birkenau on Holocaust Remembrance Day. At the March of the Living, he chanted the El Malei Rachamim, the traditional Jewish memorial prayer, for the six million Jews who perished in the Holocaust. With his two sons, Dov & Chaim, they performed Szól a Kakas Már, a Hungarian Jewish folk song composed by the Rabbi of Kalev (1751– 1821), expressing a deep yearning for the redemption of the Jewish people and their return to the land of Israel. Farkas has contributed significantly to the International March of the Living by raising funds to support more student participation. One member of the Australian delegation commented that "Shimon is perhaps the only human being who has the capability to convey and transmit the suffering of our people in the middle of the 20th century in an all-but-experiential manner."
