= Shmuel Rosenman =

Israeli educator

- שמואל רוזנמן
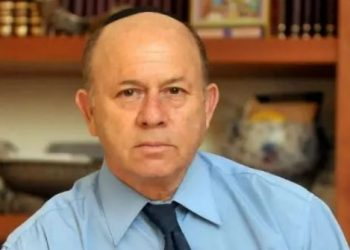
- Born: Israel
- Education: B.A. in Education and Geography; Ph.D. in Educational Administration, Pennsylvania State University
- Occupations: Educator, Chairman of International March of the Living
- Employers: International March of the Living; Bar Ilan University (former lecturer); Shaarei Mishpat Umada College (lecturer)
- Known for: Co-founder and chairman of the International March of the Living, Holocaust education
- Notable work: Founding the March of the Living

Shmuel Rosenman (Hebrew: ד"ר שמואל רוזנמן) is an Israeli educator, a co-founder and chairman of the International March of the Living, a past lecturer at Bar Ilan University's Interdisciplinary Department of Social Sciences, and a former CEO of Kupat Holim Leumit. He lectures at Shaarei Mishpat Umada College in Hod Hasharon.

== Early life and education ==
Rosenman, the son of European immigrants, was born in Israel, and was raised in Moshav Hemed, a religious moshav in central Israel, founded in 1950 by IDF veterans, who were mostly Holocaust survivors from Czechoslovakia, Poland and Romania. The people who came to the Moshav all spoke different languages, but were connected by their post-war experiences. His mother came to pre-Israel Palestine in 1933 from Poland and his father from Romania in the middle of World War II, after most of his family was murdered in the Shoah.

During his time at university, Rosenman focused his studies on education and geography and received his BA in the same two subjects. From 1972 to1977, he spent time as an emissary for the Jewish Agency in Altoona, Pennsylvania. He received a PhD from Pennsylvania State University in Educational Administration in 1977. However, it wasn't until the 1980's, while working for the Tel Aviv Education Department that he watched the nine-hour documentary "Shoah" by director Claude Lanzmann, that his life took a significant turn. In one interview, he admits overhearing a conversation between students, that there was only one chapter on the Holocaust, and that it was being taught as just another chapter of history. When he noted the number of survivors decreasing, soon no one would be left to tell the story. It is noted that Rosenman decided a serious discussion about the Holocaust should be introduced into the education system, and since then he has devoted his life to education and the memory of the Holocaust.

== March of the Living ==
Israeli Likud politician Avraham Hirschson, attorney Baruch Adler, and Rosenman searched for a significant event representing their plan, to introduce young Jews to an emotional and educational experience of the Holocaust. After exploring different possibilities, they concluded that organizing a march from Auschwitz to Birkenau would be the perfect choice. Writer and journalist Meir Uziel proposed the name "March of the Living" to contrast the death marches that were typical at the end of World War II. The March of the Living was founded in 1988, under the leadership of Hirchson, Rosenman, and Adler. The first March consisted of 1,500 Jewish youth, 50 percent Israelis, and 50% from abroad. Since that time, the March has attracted a more diverse population including large numbers of non-Jewish youth from Poland and Austria. Since its inception, almost 300,000 participants, including world leaders, educators, Holocaust survivors and students, have taken part in the program.

Rosenman has been notably outspoken in his criticism of hate speech and anti-Semitic behaviour. In May 2023, in an article marking 90 years since the Nazi regime began their campaign to burn books in Germany, Rosenman wrote “Online platforms are the new bonfires," when writing about a rise in antisemitism and hate speech. He deemed it “essential that we remain vigilant in our fight against hate speech and discrimination, and work to promote a culture of inclusivity and diversity.” In response to the shooting of two people outside a synagogue on Yom Kippur in Germany in 2019, Rosenman commented “The whole of Europe [needs] to wake up and acknowledge that it is not doing enough to eradicate antisemitism.” In 2019, Rosenman, along with March of the Living President, Phyllis Greenberg Heideman, was listed as one the 50 most influential Jews of the year. That same year Israel's news publication, Maariv published a piece featuring Baruch Adler and Rosenman's involvement in the March over the previous 31 years. It stated the two have marched at the head of the delegation every year since its inception in 1988.

In response to the 2023 Hamas-led attack on Israel on October 7, 2023, Rosenman commented on the parallels to the events in the Holocaust, noting that “ [we were] horrified by the abhorrent stories from Israel, [and] we were reminded that the hatred of the Jews has no expiration date. It changes its form. But its motivation is the same – the annihilation of the Jewish people”.

Speaking about this year's upcoming 2024 March of the Living, Rosenman stated "special attention will be paid to fighting antisemitism, with emphasis on the atrocities of October 7. Now we see the [parallel] between the Holocaust and what happened in October.”

=== 2024 March of the Living ===
On May 5th, 2024, Rosenman gave a keynote speech in Krakow, Poland, at the March of the Living’s Erev Yom Hashoah Ceremony. During his speech, he stated, “the Holocaust remains the most unique and unprecedented tragedy in Jewish and human history. But the events of October 7th, 2023, remind of this grim fact: Those same motivations, those same evil intentions, and false accusations that led to the Shoah – they are still with us today, in full force, and in full display.”

Expanding on his statement, he said, “In fact, many Holocaust survivors have told us, that the events of October 7 and the resulting wave of antisemitism that has swept through world – made them feel like they were once again living through the 1930s. And this alone should cause each one of us to tremble!

But, especially at this time, we must not – we dare not – yield to the forces of fear and despair.

Rosenman stated that the jewish people ans the state of Israel would recover from the tragedy and emerge stronger and more unified.

Rosenman closed with the famous words, “Mir Zaynen Do! We Are Here! Anachnu Kaan!”

[We are here] “And we will always be!”

== The 85th Anniversary Of The Outbreak Of World War II ==
On Sep. 1, 2024, in an article marking 85th anniversary of the outbreak of World War II, Rosenman wrote: "As we mark this year’s September 1—a day that commemorates the 85th anniversary of the outbreak of World War II—we find ourselves not only reflecting on the past but confronting the stark realities of the present. The urgency of remembering this date has never been more pronounced, especially in light of the horrific events of October 7, 2023. The antisemitic winds that have persisted since the Holocaust have, over the past year, intensified into a storm of hatred against Jews. This has been the most challenging and dangerous year for Jews worldwide since the Holocaust, both in Israel and across the globe. The lessons of the Holocaust have not been learned, and the threat to Jews remains ever-present. Eighty-five years after the outbreak of the war, calls for the destruction of Israel and the murder of Jews echo from Iran to the streets of New York, London, Paris, and beyond."

He also wrote, "In a world increasingly fractured by division and hatred, the lessons of World War II and the Holocaust are more relevant than ever. We cannot afford to be complacent. The resurgence of antisemitism, xenophobia, and other forms of bigotry demands a renewed commitment to the principles of tolerance and understanding. As we mark this September 1st, let it serve as a call to action—a reminder that the fight against hatred is ongoing, and that our commitment to truth and justice must be unwavering."

== Response To The SPHR Announcement At McGill University ==
On June 18, 2024, Rosenman responded to and denounced the Solidarity for Palestinian Human Rights (SPHR) promising a "revolutionary" education. The program's poster appeared on social media platforms X and Instagram and featured people holding automatic weapons and "pledges to redefine McGill's elite institutional legacy by transforming its space in one of revolutionary education."

Commenting on the SPHR's advertised "revolutionary summer youth program," International March of the Living Chairperson Rosenman and President Phyllis Greenberg Heideman expressed, "Education for young people should never encourage the use of violence. When actions by students on campus, promoted by social media companies, make Holocaust survivors fear setting foot on campus and fear for the future of their grandchildren – it is clear that both the university and social media organizations have lost their way. Now it is high time to find their way back."

The March of the Living website released their own statement: "International March of the Living condemns in the strongest possible terms the plans announced by Solidarity for Palestinian Human Rights (SPHR) at McGill University for a summer youth program promising "revolutionary" education."

=== Commenting on recent international survey data on antisemitism ===
In an article written in January 2024, Rosenman has this to say:

“Just before the 80th anniversary of the liberation of Auschwitz, data shows that antisemitism is no longer hiding on the margins but is breaking out and being accepted even in places that are supposed to be beacons of values and human love. Today, 80 years after the Holocaust, the situation of Jews is the worst it has been since that dark time. This train can be stopped, even though it is currently hurtling toward the abyss – and fast.”

— Shmuel Rosenman

== 360° Testimony on Location ==
In his 2026 book Holocaust XR: Immersive Technologies as the Last Act of Testimony, Stephen D. Smith described the International March of the Living as the first programmatic partner of 360° Testimony on Location, a project that records Holocaust survivors giving testimony at historical sites connected to their experiences. Smith wrote that the recordings were being considered for inclusion in the USC Shoah Foundation's Visual History Archive and that their use in its IWalk and IWitness educational programs was under development.x

Rosenman said the recordings could be the "cornerstones" of future March of the Living trips when survivors were no longer able to accompany students in person, allowing survivor testimony to remain part of the program's educational experience.
