= Blind Love (2015 film) =

Blind Love: A Holocaust Journey Through Poland with Man’s Best Friend
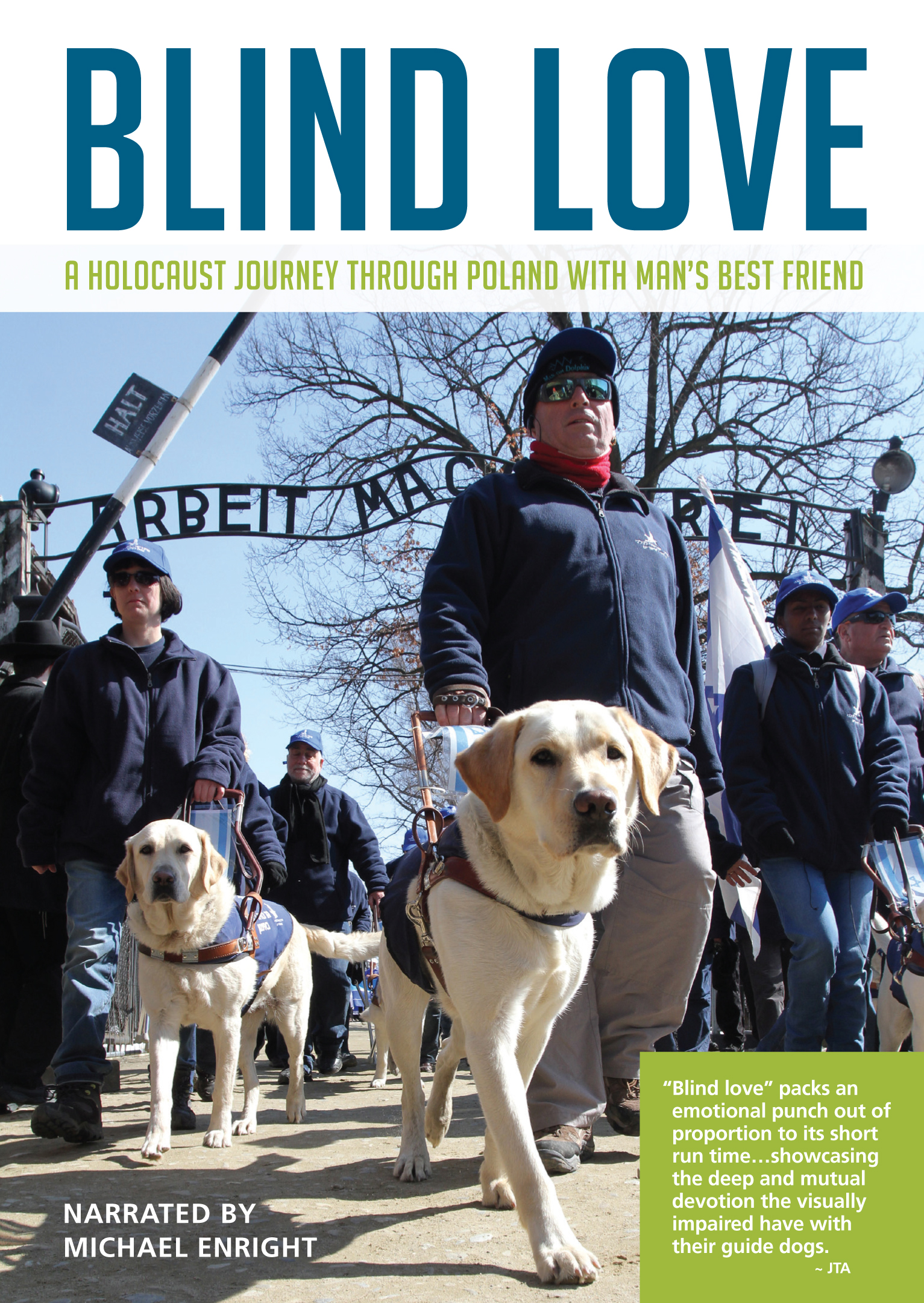
- Blind Love DVD cover
- Directed by: Eli Rubenstein and Naomi Wise
- Produced by: Eli Rubenstein and Naomi Wise
- Release date: November 2015

Blind Love: A Holocaust Journey Through Poland with Man's Best Friend is a 2015 documentary film about blind Israelis traveling to Poland with the help of their guide dogs, to learn about the Holocaust. Footage includes blind participants taking part in the 2012 and 2013 March of the Living programs. The film is narrated by Michael Enright of the Canadian Broadcasting Corp.

== Synopsis ==
Blind Love recounts a trip to Poland of six blind Israelis and their guide dogs who took part in the annual March of the Living, where they visited once thriving sites of Jewish life and culture. On Holocaust Remembrance Day, the blind participants and their guide dogs marched from Auschwitz-Birkenau in memory of the victims of Nazi genocide and against prejudice, intolerance and hate.

The Holocaust survivors who appear in the film are Belgian Auschwitz survivor David Shentow, and Polish born Max Glauben, a survivor of the Warsaw Ghetto and Majdanek. Both survivors reflect upon the dramatic contrast in the usage of dogs by those who sought to harm innocent people and those who employ dogs in the service of others. David Shentow describes his arrival in Auschwitz at 17 years of age, recalling how the man standing next to him was attacked - and killed - by a German Shepherd upon the order of a Nazi guard for refusing to part with a family photo. Max Glauben shares his impressions about seeing guide dogs on the March of the Living, helping - not attacking - the blind Jewish visitors walking through the former concentration camp.

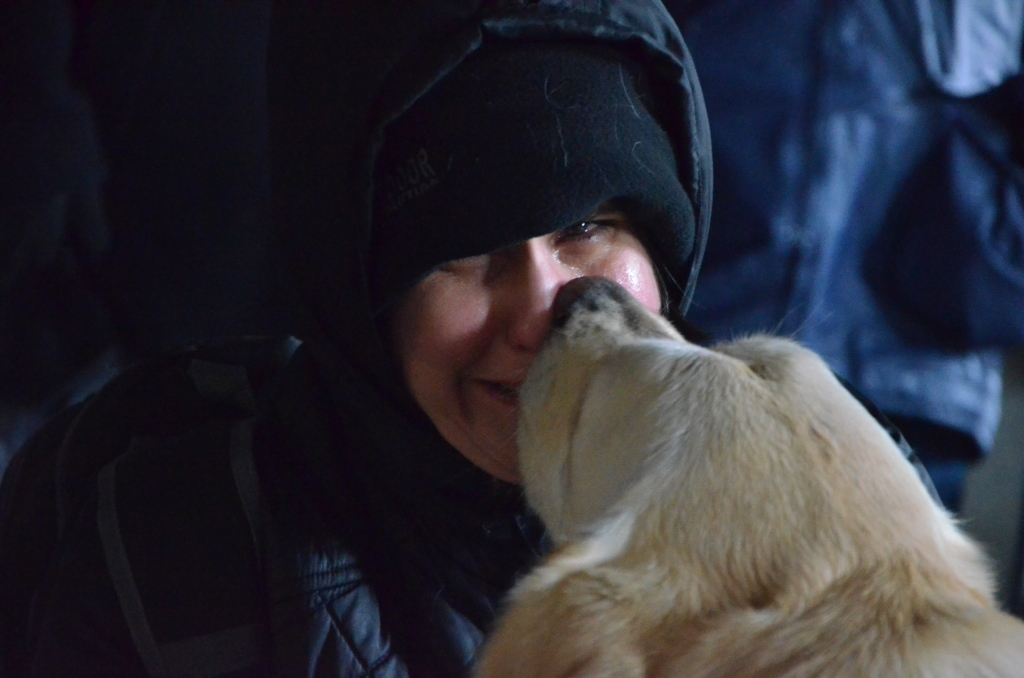
Liron Artzi & Guide Dog Petel

Commenting on the symbolism of the project, director Eli Rubenstein said "The Nazis didn’t just murder Jews, they murdered people with disabilities. And the Nazis trained German Shepherds to torture and kill prisoners." Rubenstein is President of the Canadian support group of the Israel Guide Dog Center for the Blind, and National Director of the March of the Living Canada.

During one scene inside the former gas chamber at the Majdanek concentration camp, Liron Artzi, a partially sighted lawyer from Tel Aviv, is overcome with emotion. Her dog Petel responds to her distress by licking the tears from her face. Artzi described it as a "powerful experience" in a later interview, saying "Petel understood what was going on. It was like she was telling me ‘I am here with you in every moment.’"

The interaction between Liron and her guide dog Petel in Majdanek, as well as Holocaust survivor Max Glauben's encounter with guide dogs in Auschwitz-Birkenau - during the March of the Living - appear in Witness: Passing the Torch of Holocaust Memory to New Generations published in late 2015.

Holocaust survivor David Shentow also appears in the film, recalling his first moments in Auschwitz, when the German guards set their dogs upon the prisoner standing next to him, killing him instantly.

"A gentleman standing beside me stopped the SS man very politely: Excuse me sir, I will leave the luggage – can I just take out a picture? The SS man lost his temper and let the dogs loose. They didn’t run, they just flew in the air straight to the men’s neck, and as the man stopped moving, I said: My God this man is dead! And this was the first 10 -15 minutes. I knew I am in Hell.”

Shentow also contrasts the Nazis training of dogs to attack prisoners along with the Nazi genocidal treatment of people with disabilities, with the experience of a group of blind Israelis traveling to Auschwitz on the March of the Living with their guide dogs.

“These dogs were there to kill, these dogs are here for life. ….[Those dogs] were trained to jump on people’s necks – then you see a dog like that – like night and day.”

Amir Haskel appears in the film as the delegation's guide through the film. He commented on the selection process with regards to people with disabilities during the Holocaust, “The first selection was for those who were able to work. Those who were not were sent directly to be killed. The fate of people who were disabled was sealed immediately.”

== Broadcast Coverage ==
The film was broadcast in the United States on PBS Western Reserve in Kent, Ohio (September 6, 2022), NHPBS in Durham, New Hampshire, Iowa PBS in Johnson, Iowa, and WPBS in Watertown, New York (April 21, 2022). In Canada, the film aired on CBC's Documentary channel

== Reviews ==
An inspirational and heartwarming movie.

— Bruce Cowley, Creative Head, CBC’s Documentary Channel

“Blind Love” packs an emotional punch out of proportion to its short run time…showcasing the deep and mutual devotion the visually impaired have with their guide dogs.

— Ron Csillag, JTA

[The] film captures devotion of guide dogs and their masters.

— Paul Lungen, Canadian Jewish News

[Blind Love] sensitively describes the journey of six Israelis and their guide dogs to Poland to visit former concentration camps and once thriving sites of Jewish life and culture... [It] is truly an eye-opening and compelling film... and a finely woven documentary framing

— Avrum Rosensweig, Huffington Post

Her guide dog, Petel, reacted instinctively. Nuzzling close to Liron, licking the tears from her face. You can learn empathy. Practice it. But this was empathy as existence. A natural form of being. Blind Love in a place of Blind Hate. The universal truth of that moment is what good storytelling is about.

— Vac Verikaitis, commenting on a scene of the guide dog nuzzling her blind master in one of the former gas chambers

== Support ==
Blind Love was made possible in part, through grants from the Citizenship & Immigration Canada - Multiculturalism Section, and the Claims Conference to March of the Living Digital Archives Project. The Digital Archives Project aims to gather Holocaust testimony from Canadian survivors who, since 1988, have traveled to Poland on the March of the Living to share their Holocaust stories with their young students in the locations they transpired.

== Screenings ==
Blind Love premièred in November 2015 as part of Holocaust Education Week in Toronto, with the co-sponsorship of the Toronto Jewish Film Festival. It was also broadcast on the CBC's Canadian speciality channel Documentary in late 2015. In 2016, the POLIN Museum of the History of Polish Jews in Warsaw, Poland screened the film several times, including one screening at a disabilities program. The Polish version of the film was narrated by Magdalena Cielecka a well known Polish film and theatre actress.

It was also screened at the Edmonton Jewish Film Festival on May 23, 2016.

On April 24, 2017, Yom Hashoah, Holocaust Remembrance Day, Blind Love premiered in Israel on Channel 10 (Israel), and was simultaneously broadcast in Canada on CBC's Documentary Channel (Canada)
