= March of the Living =

Annual international Holocaust education and remembrance program

- Native name: Marsz Żywych (Polish), מצעד החיים (Hebrew)
- Date: March or April annually
- Location: Auschwitz-Birkenau, Poland
- Type: March
- Theme: The Holocaust
- Cause: Holocaust remembrance and education
- Participants: Students, Holocaust survivors, dignitaries
- Website: https://motl.org

The March of the Living (Hebrew: מצעד החיים, Mits'ad HaKhayim; Polish: Marsz Żywych) is an annual educational program which brings students from around the world to Poland, where they explore the remnants of the Holocaust. On Holocaust Memorial Day observed in the Jewish calendar (Yom HaShoah), thousands of participants march silently from Auschwitz to Birkenau.

The March of the Living was founded in 1988, under the leadership of Israeli Likud politician Abraham Hirchson, Shmuel Rosenman, and Israeli attorney Baruch Adler, a child of a Holocaust survivor who was hidden by one of the Righteous Among the Nations. Adler travelled to Auschwitz-Birkenau in 1986 to set the groundwork for the first March of the Living, and also to search for his mother's rescuer (but could not make contact until the fall of Communism, after 1989).

Speaking about the founding of the March of the Living, Adler paid tribute to values he learned from his mother and her rescuer. “We believe that our children and grandchildren will continue carrying the torch of identification with the values of loyalty, courage, perseverance and faith in life, and hope that goodness will prevail. This message is well understood, perhaps more than anyone else, by the organizers and participants of the March of the Living."

Since its inception, almost 300,000 participants – including world leaders, educators, Holocaust survivors and students – have taken part in the program.

== History ==
The program was established in 1988 and takes place annually for two weeks around April and May, immediately following Passover. The initial program involved approximately 1500 Jewish high school students and teachers, mostly from North America, France, and Israel. Since 1996, it has been held annually.

The Israeli founders of the March of the Living were politician Avraham Hirschson, educator Dr. Shmuel Rosenman, and attorney Baruch Adler. They were assisted in the early years by Jewish communal leaders and philanthropists from the United States (Alvin Schiff, Gene Greenzweig, Dr. David Machlis, and Joseph Wilf, the first North American Chair of the March of the Living), and Canada (Walter Hess, Shlomo Shimon, Rabbi Irwin Witty, and Eli Rubenstein).

In 1988, the initial march gathered considerable media attention. Notable personalities such as Rabbi Israel Meir Lau, Yitzhak Navon, Bibi Netanyahu, and some Polish dignitaries were among its attendees. In a 1988 Maariv article, published on the day of the first March of the Living, on April 14, 1988, mention is made of additional important dignitaries in attendance, including: Avraham Sharir, Simcha Dinitz, Shevach Wiess, Matityahu Drobles, and March of the Living cofounder, Avraham Hirschson. Other cofounders in attendance were Dr. Shmuel Rosenman & Baruch Adler.

For the first time since the March's inception, the Israeli delegations have cancelled their participation in the event scheduled for April 14, 2026. This decision was taken in light of concerns for the participants' safety and limitations on the number of passengers flying out of Ben Gurion International Airport under wartime restrictions. Sixty Holocaust survivors from Israel ages 85 to 100 were to have attended, joining some 40 from other countries. (During the years of the COVID-19 pandemic the March was entirely cancelled.) Of an expected 8,800 Marchers from around the globe, the Israeli delegations were to comprise 1,000 participants. These included organizations of IDF Widows and Orphans, Israeli hi-tech companies including Fiverr who for the second year undertook sponsoring Holocaust survivors and their families, Tik-Tok creators, and more.

== Special events ==
=== Commemoration of World War II death marches ===
Writer and journalist Meir Uziel proposed the name "March of the Living" to contrast the death marches that were typical at the end of World War II. When Nazi Germany withdrew its soldiers from forced-labour camps, inmates – most already starving and stricken by oppressive work – were forced to march hundreds of miles farther west, while those who lagged behind or fell were shot or left to freeze to death in the winter climate. The March of the Living, in contrast to the death marches, serves to illustrate the continued existence of the Jewish people despite Nazi attempts at their obliteration.

Professor Jackie Feldman, quoting Avraham Hirschson, mentions the March of the Living and its relation to the death marches in his book, Above the Death Pits, Beneath the Flag: Youth Voyages to Poland and the Performance of Israeli National Identity:

In the March of the Living ceremony at Birkenau in 1994, organizer and Israeli MK Avraham Hirchson addressed the crowd: "This is also the March of the Dead who never stopped marching and still march with us and accompany us like the pillar or fire the led the Jewish camp in the Bible. Period. They will march with us today; They will march with us tomorrow and next week; And they will return with us to Eretz Israel.” (Translated in Stier) 1995:57.

After spending a week in Poland visiting other sites of Nazi Germany's persecution, such as Majdanek, Treblinka, and the Warsaw Ghetto, and former sites of Jewish life and culture, various Synagogues, many of the participants in the March also travel on to Israel where they observe Yom HaZikaron and celebrate Israel's Independence Day.

=== Exhibit at the United Nations (2014) ===
In mid January 2014 a new exhibit on the March of the Living opened at the United Nations, which housed the exhibit until the end of March 2014. Titled "When you Listen to a Witness, You Become a Witness", the exhibit includes photographs, documents and writings devoted to the 25-year history of the March of the Living.

An interactive component of the exhibition allows visitors to fill out their own pledge of tolerance and compassion which may be taken on the March of the Living and planted alongside thousands of other plaques of tolerance and compassion on the very grounds of Auschwitz-Birkenau.

The title of the exhibit is taken from the words of Judy Weissenberg Cohen in a speech given to students on the 1997 March of the Living describing the last time she saw her mother during the selection of Hungarian Jewry in Auschwitz-Birkenau in the spring of 1944.

On 10 March 2014, a group of students from New York's Pine Bush High School – part of a district where there have been press reports alleging widespread antisemitism – visited the UN Exhibit. They were addressed by Holocaust survivors Judy Weissenberg Cohen and Fanya Heller, as well as by Rick Carrier, a World War II Liberator.

The UN Exhibit became the basis of a book published in the fall of 2015, titled, Witness: Passing the Torch of Holocaust Memory to New Generations. The book has a unique interactive feature where the survivors, World War II liberators, and Righteous Among the Nations featured in the book, include an invisible link embedded on their image. When their image is accessed with a smart phone or other device, the reader is taken to an excerpt of their video testimony on USC Shoah Foundation Institute for Visual History and Education (created by Steven Spielberg) or March of the Living Digital Archive Project websites. Translations in several other languages are already in the works.

=== Event in Jerusalem (2016) ===
In May 2016, the March of the Living held a large celebratory event near Jerusalem on Yom Ha'atzmaut (Israel Independence Day). Co-founder, Shmuel Rosenman introduced the ninth president of Israel, Shimon Peres. During his speech, he was quoted saying, "I know people say that Israel is a miracle. Israel is not a miracle – Israel is a belief, a hope, a trust, a land – it's not an accident!...The founding of State of Israel was done by people who believe in human beings, who believe in a better world, who believe peace and friendship. And I'm telling you, this is the future!" "Some people are afraid of anti-Semites – don't be afraid. They have an ugly past, and they'll have a dark future. They believe in eternity and we believe in eternity. Their eternity is hate, our eternity is love....Nobody could have broken us. They hate us, they persecute us, they killed many of us, but we remain and we shall remain, and we shall win because we stand on the side of man, of the right, of justice, of the future!"

"I want to tell you, young and old, the job is not over. But what we have achieved guarantees that we can be over the goal. We can do much more. You can do much more! And you should do much more!"

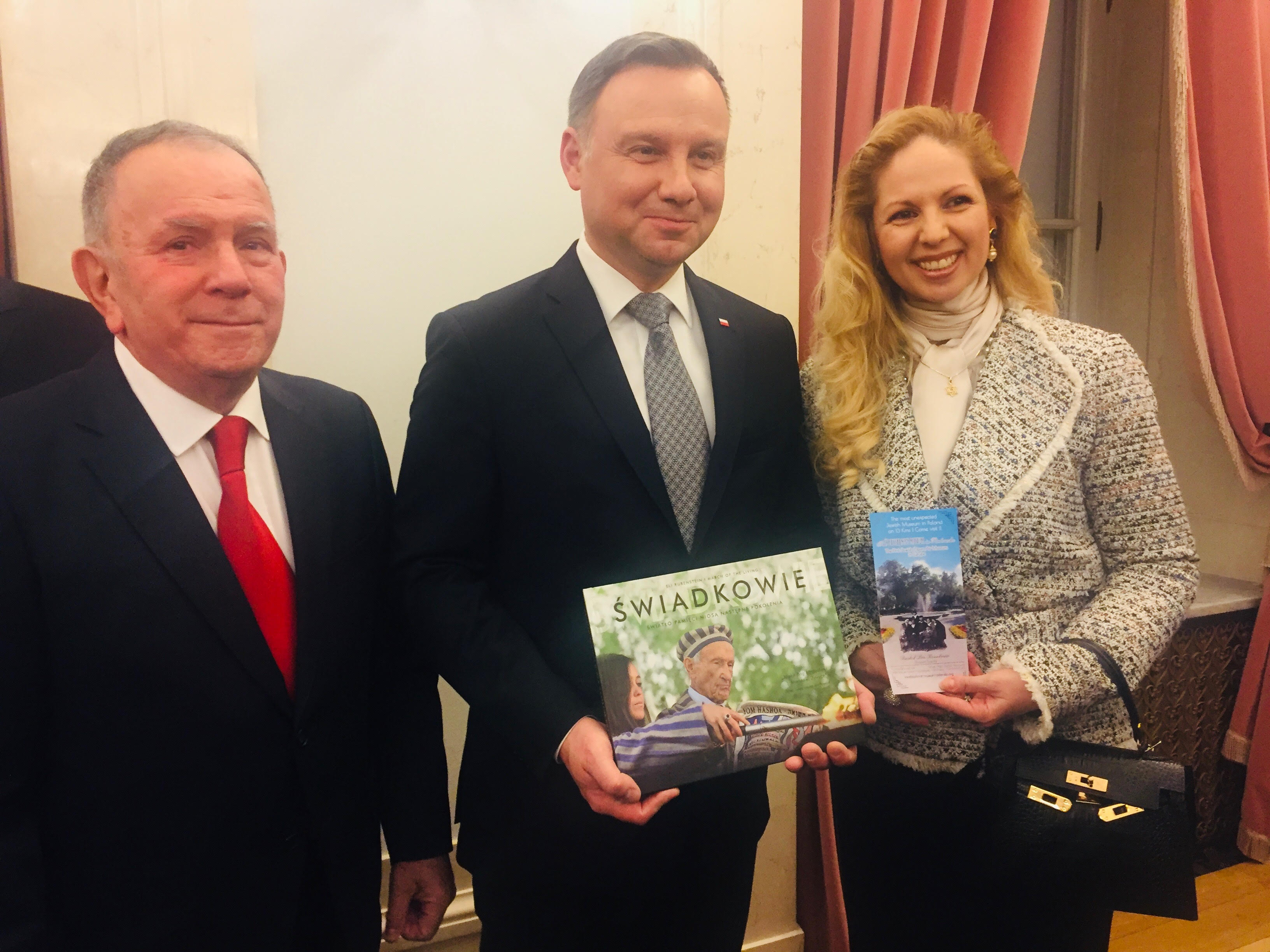
Aharon Tamir (left), deputy chairman of March of the Living, meeting with Polish president Andrzej Duda in 2019

In recent years the March of the Living (MOTL) has attempted to broaden its focus from only concentrating on the Holocaust, and include other program content in the Poland portion of the trip. These elements include: celebrating Jewish life before the war, establishing dialogue with Polish students, meeting with Polish Righteous among the Nations, and connecting with the contemporary Polish Jewish community.

=== UN commemoration (2018) ===
in 2018, marking 30 years since the first March, Israel's delegation to the United Nations headquarters held an event with participation from Holocaust Survivors and other ambassadors from around the world. The reports also note a second reason for the gathering, a new law passed in Poland, absolving them of responsibility for the Holocaust. During the event, an exhibition called "Testimony" was inaugurated. The exhibition features a collection of photographs showcasing Holocaust survivors as well as students who have taken part in the parade since 1988, creating an additional experience for its visitors. Israel's Ambassador to the UN, Danny Danon talked about witnessing attempts rewrite history, saying, "It is precisely from the UN headquarters that was established following the greatest tragedy known to mankind that we must oppose any move to change the face of history and rewrite it. Every day, and especially on this day, it is more important than ever to remember those who perished and perpetuate the truth." March of the Living's president and co-founder Phyllis Heideman said, "We should not see the Holocaust as a historical, distant event, but as a perpetual symbol of darkness and darkness." Co-founder and chairman Dr. Shmuel Rosenman, speaking about the March explained, "The youth go to Poland for a week and from there to Israel for a week. Even before they leave for the trip, 12 meetings are held in which they receive an overview of everything related to the Holocaust and Israel. Close to 40% of the youth, by the way, are not Jewish."

As part of a global initiative to raise awareness about antisemitism, the march includes non-Jewish young people as well. They believe that the key to fighting this disease is through clear and defined efforts to combat it, and they hope to spark a meaningful conversation about the issue.

=== International Holocaust Remembrance Day at the U.N. – New York Stock Exchange (2026) ===
On January 27, 2026, Holocaust survivors participated in commemorations for International Holocaust Remembrance Day at both the United Nations headquarters and the New York Stock Exchange (NYSE) in New York City. The events were organized in connection with the International March of the Living and were intended to emphasize the urgency of Holocaust education amid rising global antisemitism.

Among the speakers was Nate Leipciger, a Canadian Holocaust survivor and longtime educator, who addressed attendees at the NYSE. In his remarks, Leipciger emphasized that Holocaust remembrance is not only historical but a moral obligation, warning against denial, distortion, and indifference. He called on institutions, including business and technology leaders, to ensure that progress is guided by human dignity and responsibility.

91-year-old Holocaust survivor, Sara Weinstein, also delivered testimony. She recounted her childhood during the Holocaust, the murder of family members, years of displacement and survival, and her eventual rebuilding of life after the war. She warned that antisemitism does not begin with violence but with words, incitement, and silence, stressing that survivors speak on behalf of those who were murdered and can no longer testify. Weinstein emphasized that forgetting the Holocaust posed a continuing danger to society. At the United Nations, Weinstein addressed diplomats and representatives, urging global leaders to treat “Never Again” as a commitment to action rather than symbolism. Israeli Ambassador to the UN Danny Danon also spoke, stating that Holocaust remembrance must translate into confronting contemporary hatred and violence.

=== NYSE closing bell ===
Later that day, several survivors, Nate Leipciger, Sara Weinstein, Celia Kenner, and Eva Kuper participated in the ringing of the NYSE closing bell. The gesture was intended to symbolically link Holocaust remembrance with global, civic, and economic institutions. The delegation was associated with preparations for the 2026 March of the Living.

=== Berlin Kristallnacht commemoration (2026) ===
On 5 November 2026, the International March of the Living convened police and law enforcement leaders from Germany, other European countries and the United States at the New Synagogue in Berlin to commemorate the 88th anniversary of the November 1938 pogroms, also known as Kristallnacht. The event, titled "Not on Our Watch: Operationalizing Never Again", was held with the German Police Union, EU.Pol, Rutgers University's Miller Center on Policing and Community Resilience, the University of Virginia Center for Public Safety and Justice, and the Jewish Community in Berlin.

Jochen Kopelke, federal chairman of the German Police Union and president of EU.Pol, addressed the gathering. Kopelke, who had participated in the 2026 March of the Living, spoke about the responsibility to remember the Holocaust, confront antisemitism and protect Jewish communities. He also recalled Berlin police officer Wilhelm Krützfeld, who intervened to protect the New Synagogue during the November 1938 pogroms.

== Cultural impact ==
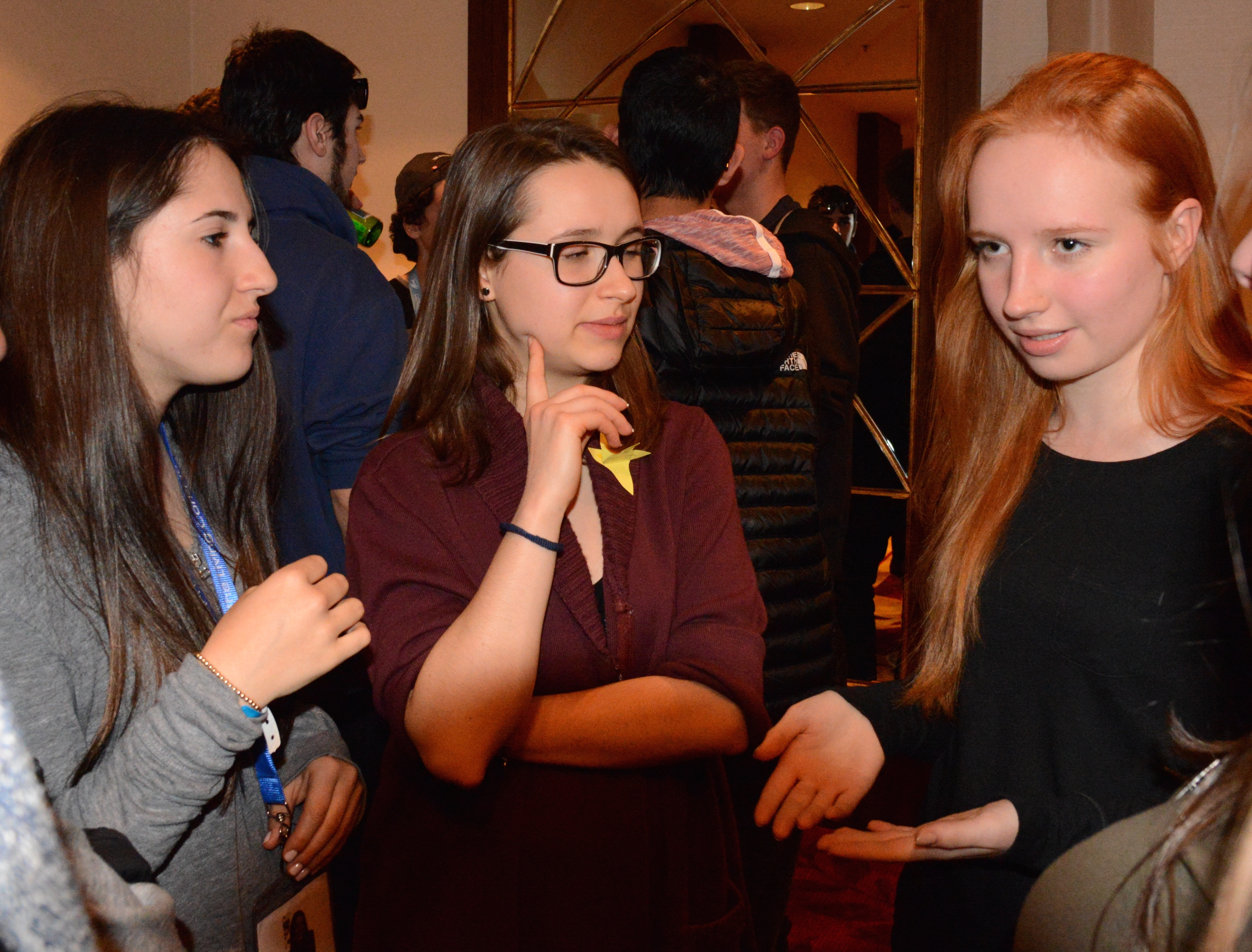

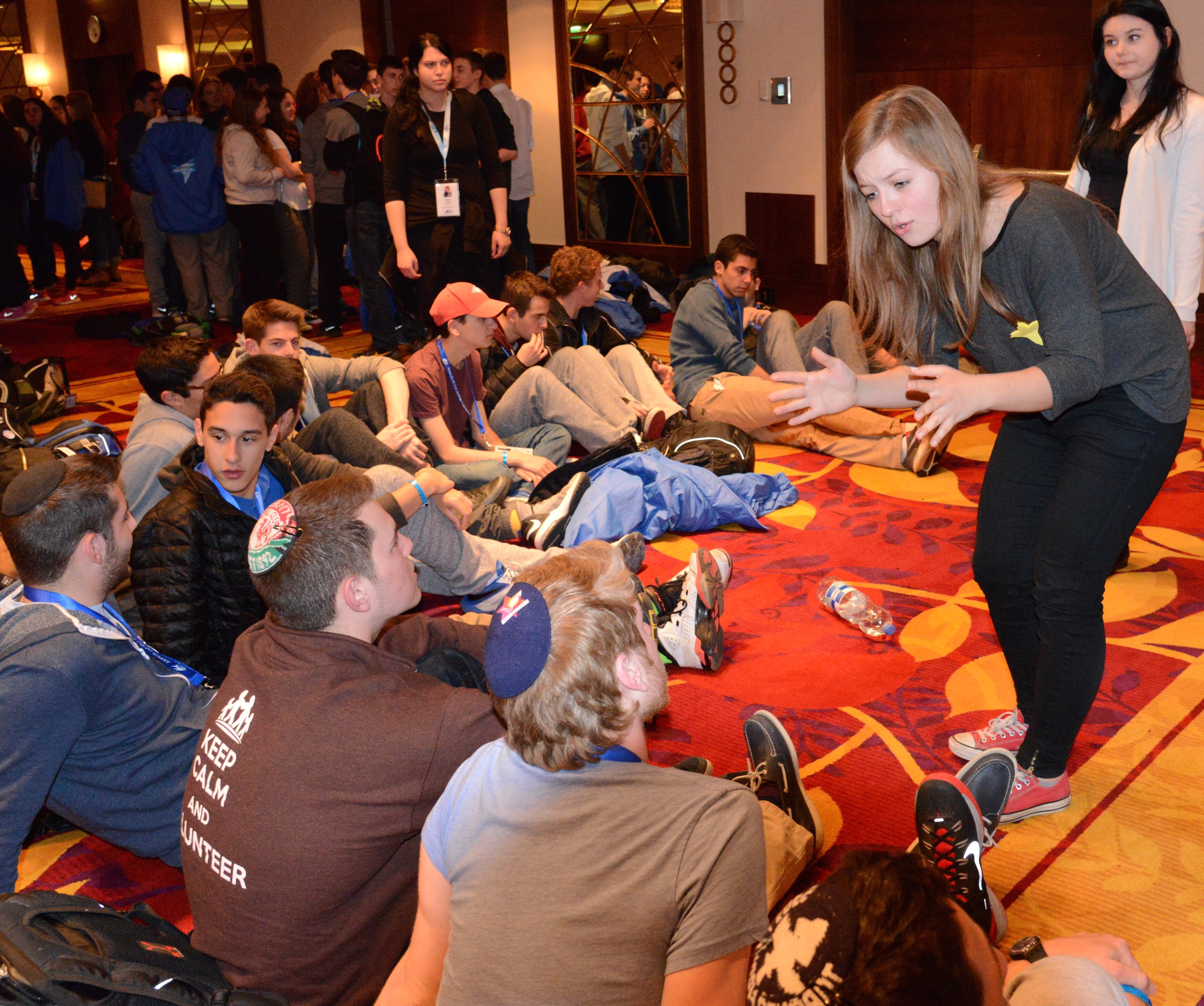

The March of the Living has significantly influenced global Holocaust remembrance and education since its inception in 1988. A cornerstone of the March is the firsthand accounts shared by Holocaust survivors at the sites where atrocities occurred. These narratives provide participants with a profound understanding of history, fostering a personal connection to the events of the Holocaust. As the number of living survivors diminishes, initiatives like the March of the Living Digital Archive Project have been established to record and preserve these testimonies for future generations.

=== 360° survivor testimony ===
The International March of the Living became the first programmatic partner of the USC Shoah Foundation's 360° Testimony on Location project. The collaboration, arranged through March of the Living's Director of Education Eli Rubenstein, focused on making testimony recorded at Holocaust sites available to future participants after survivors are no longer able to accompany student groups. Holocaust survivor testimonies filmed in special 360-degree technology give viewers a panoramic, immersive view of the surroundings of the events being recounted and recorded in the historic sites where the survivors stories transpired—such as former concentration camps, ghettos, or their childhood homes. Viewers of their testimonies can access the entire panoramic environment surrounding the survivor as their story unfolds by manipulating the cursor on their screens, thus allowing viewers to see the overall scale and layout of historical sites.

In his 2026 book, Holocaust XR: Immersive Technologies as the Last Act of Testimony, Stephen D. Smith reported that the material was being considered for use through the USC Shoah Foundation's Visual History Archive, IWalk and IWitness programs. March of the Living chairman Shmuel Rosenman said the 360 testimonies were expected to become an important part of future journeys by continuing to connect students with survivors' accounts. “These testimonies promise to become cornerstones of future March of the Living trips, when survivors can no longer personally accompany the students, ensuring that the survivors’ memories will continue to guide generations to come," he said.

In May 2023, The March of the Living's Chairman described the modern culture of the new participants saying, "This year, we brought a new group of young leaders: online influencers and bloggers were on the March. They helped us reach new audiences of young people. Millions of views on social media, thousands of comments, shares and "likes". Because in a world where books are not burned but rather cancelled online, we should all be united in speaking out against antisemitism and all forms of hatred."

When speaking about this year's upcoming march [in 2024] Rosenman stated special attention will be paid to fighting antisemitism, with emphasis on the atrocities of 7 October. "Now we see the [parallel] between the Holocaust and what happened in October."

In January 2024, the Israeli president Isaac Herzog hosted an event at his residence with March of the Living to commemorate the Kindertransport, which brought nearly 10,000 children from Germany, Austria, Czechoslovakia, and Poland to the United Kingdom in 1938–1939 during the Nazi regime. The event brought survivors of the Holocaust together and those who were part of the Kindertransport. Chairman Shmuel Rosenman commented "[We were] shocked by the stories of the survivors about what they experienced 85 years ago, and horrified by the abhorrent stories from Israel. We were reminded that the hatred of the Jews has no expiration date. It changes its form. But its motivation is the same – the annihilation of the Jewish people."

It is worth noting that a group of 30 adults, young adults, and Holocaust survivors from Australia is set to participate in the March of the Living in 2024, representing the Australian delegation's 23rd year in attendance. Since 2001, when Australia first joined the March, around 2,000 Australians have taken part in this event. This number includes 1,200 students, 450 adults, 300 educators and survivors, and 50 young adults.

== Notable participants and world leaders ==
Israeli skeleton athlete Jared Firestone described attending the March of the Living in 2008 as a formative experience that strengthened his Jewish identity and connection to Israel. He recounted visiting Auschwitz and confronting the reality of the Holocaust beyond books and films, noting the impact of entering the camp and considering the uncertainty faced by victims. Firestone also recalled accompanying Holocaust survivor Irene Zisblatt into the gas chambers where her family had been murdered. Firestone cited the program as part of his motivation to pursue elite competition. Firestone has qualified to debut at the 2026 Winter Olympics.

In a 2024 interview, American rugby Olympic bronze medallist, Sarah Levy, who attended the 2014 March of the Living as a high-school student from San Diego, said her participation was motivated by an interest in Holocaust history and a desire to better understand how it occurred. She described the visit to Polish sites as making the events “materialize,” highlighted the emotional impact of hearing survivor testimony and visiting memorials such as Belzec, and identified the march from Auschwitz to Birkenau as the most meaningful moment due to the sense of shared experience among thousands of Jewish participants. Levy also stated the experience created a sense of belonging to a global Jewish community and formed lasting friendships that continued years later.

New England Patriots owner Robert Kraft led a delegation in 2023, including rapper, Meek Mill. Kraft lit the opening torch and linked his participation to combating antisemitism through his Foundation to Combat Antisemitism, presenting the march as both memorial observance and contemporary educational advocacy.

IN 2023, President Sergio Mattarella, attended the main ceremony and addressed participants there. Mattarella He emphasized that societies must not tolerate any erosion of fundamental rights and freedoms that underpin peaceful coexistence, and warned that those who attack the international order based on these principles should know that free peoples are united and determined to defend them. He returned in 2025 to participate on the March at Auschwitz.

The 28th March of the Living, held on 2 May 2019, was attended by dignitaries, including the Romanian Prime Minister Viorica Dăncilă, the President of the Greek Parliament Nicos Voutsis, and the representative of the Polish Government Jan Krzysztof Ardanowski. The march also drew ambassadors of the United States from various countries, the Israeli Ambassador to Poland Anna Azari, and clergymen of many denominations. The procession was led by Bartholomew I, Archbishop of Constantinople, New Rome and Ecumenical Patriarch.

== Elie Wiesel Commemoration ==
Elie Wiesel had a longstanding association with the March of the Living and its educational emphasis on Holocaust survivor testimony. He served on the Presidium of the first March of the Living in 1988 and later participated in the program in 1990 and 2005. At the 2005 March, held on the 60th anniversary of the end of the Second World War, Wiesel addressed more than 18,000 participants, which March of the Living described as the largest event in the program's history.

In 2006, March of the Living also facilitated Wiesel's visit to Auschwitz with Oprah Winfrey, which was later broadcast on ''The Oprah Winfrey Show.”

Wiesel's statement, "When you listen to a witness, you become a witness", has been adopted by March of the Living to describe the organization's focus on transmitting Holocaust memory from survivors to younger generations. In 2026, to mark the tenth anniversary of Wiesel's death, March of the Living published a commemorative tribute by Eli Rubenstein in The Jerusalem Post and on its own website, reflecting on Wiesel's influence on the program from its founding years onward.

As part of the same anniversary coverage, award-winning actress Tara Strong, an alumna of the 1990 March of the Living, wrote a first-person reflection recalling Wiesel's address at Auschwitz-Birkenau during that year's program. Strong wrote that she attended the March as part of the Canadian delegation and was a member of the Toronto March of the Living student choir, which sang Hannah Senesh's "Eli, Eli" after Wiesel became overcome with emotion and was unable to continue speaking, leaving the stage.

Strong connected the program's message of “Never Forget” and “Never Again” to contemporary antisemitism, writing that “Never Again Is Now.” In the essay, she contrasted Wiesel's emotional silence at Auschwitz-Birkenau in 1990 with what she described as a “new silence” among colleagues, friends, public figures, some women's organizations, and some Jews who, in her view, had become reluctant to speak publicly against antisemitism or in support of Jewish victims following the October 7 attacks. Strong wrote that her March of the Living experience, including visiting Auschwitz-Birkenau and Majdanek and singing in the choir, had shaped her later public advocacy against antisemitism and her belief in using one's voice against hatred.

== Planting commemorative plaques ==
A long-standing tradition at the March of the Living is for students to be given wooden plaques on which they inscribe a message and then plant in the grounds of Birkenau upon the conclusion of the March. The plaques often include the names of family members who perished in Holocaust and of the duty to remember and the pledge of “Never Again!" Some plaques contain messages of hope for world peace or other personal messages composed by the students as a result of their experience on the March. Many of the students photograph their plaques as a keepsake and reminder of their experience on the March.

Following the 2024 March of the Living, the Auschwitz-Birkenau State Museum reported the following: "Participants in the March placed numerous wooden plaques bearing the names of victims at the site, intended to represent Jewish tombstones (matzevot). Some of these plaques were laid along the nearby railway tracks, adjacent to the platform where German SS physicians carried out the selection of Jews deported from occupied European countries for extermination at Auschwitz."

Professor Oren Stier relates that on the March of the Living, participants were told to:

"plant plaques with the names of the dead in the ruins of the crematoria; this planting was linked with the planting of trees by participants in Israel later on in the voyage. (19) One of the March participants describes the two plantings as a contrast between darkness and light, death and new life (Stier 1995: 60–61)."

== Documentaries and publications ==
In 1988, the March of the Living program began with around 1500 Jewish high school students and teachers from North America, France, and Israel. The very first documentary film on the program was made during this time, following the Florida March of the Living delegation. This was an Emmy Award-winning film with Suzanne Lasky Gerard directing, while Colleen Dewhurst and Jonathan Silverman provided the narration, and the soundtrack was by Vadim Dreyzin. The film was updated by director in 2023, and titled "The March of the Living: Then and Now." In 1993, "For You Who Died I Must Live On...Reflections on the March of the Living" was published by Mosaic Press. The book was edited by Eli Rubenstein, and featured the experiences from participants on the March from its first four years. It was subtitled, "Contemporary Jewish Youth Confront the Holocaust." The book won the 1994 Canadian Jewish Book Award.

Each of Us Has a Name (1999) was produced and directed by Fern Levitt follows the journey of Canadian Jewish teenagers and Holocaust survivors on the March of the Living as they visit former Nazi German death camps in Poland, as well as other historic sites in the country.

In 2009 two different documentaries featured March of the Living participants or students on similar experiences during their time on the trip. The documentary Defamation, by filmmaker Yoav Shamir, includes a group of Israeli students during their time at Poland sites, including the stop at Auschwitz. Director Jessica Sanders made a documentary titled March of the Living, which focuses entirely on the program and participants.

Witness: Passing the Torch of Holocaust Memory to New Generations is a book authored by Eli Rubenstein and published by Second Story Press in 2015. The book is inspired by a 2014 United Nations exhibit showcasing the reflections and images of Holocaust survivors and students who participated in the March of the Living since 1988. Witness has been published in Spanish, Polish, and Hebrew languages. In 2020, a special edition of the book was released to commemorate the 75th anniversary of the end of WWII and the liberation of Europe from Nazi tyranny. This edition features liberation stories of Holocaust survivors, an afterword by Steven Spielberg, founder of the USC Shoah Foundation, and content from Pope John Paul II and Pope Francis related to the March of the Living and stories concerning the Righteous Among the Nations.

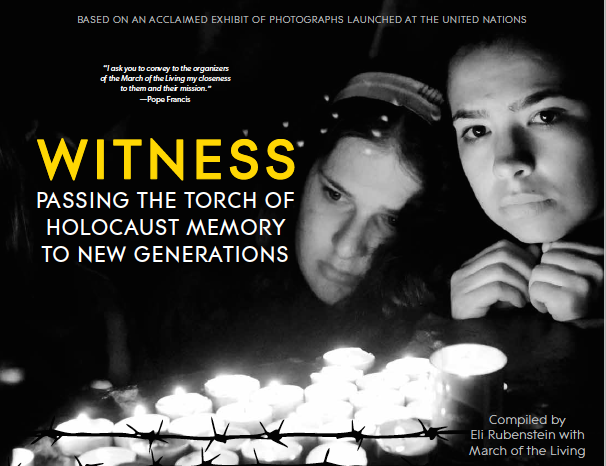

Notable individuals quoted in Witness

Pope Francis: "Work for peace. Unite with people from different cultures and religions. Keep an open heart. Don't discriminate. Welcome and understand others. May God bless you."

Pope John Paul II: "I know all about the March of the Living. God bless your daughter, and God bless the March of the Living."

President Barack Obama: "I think of Pinchas Gutter, a man who lived through the Warsaw Ghetto Uprising, and survived the Majdanek death camp…'I tell my story,' he says, 'for the purpose of improving humanity, drop by drop by drop. Like a drop of water falls on a stone and erodes it, so, hopefully, by telling my story over and over again, I will achieve the purpose of making the world a better place to live in.' Those are the words of one survivor – performing that sacred duty of memory – that will echo throughout eternity. Those are good words for all of us to live by."

Elie Wiesel: "Forever will I see the children who no longer have the strength to cry. Forever will I see the elderly who no longer have the strength to help them. Forever will I see the mothers and the fathers, the grandfathers and grandmothers, the little schoolchildren…their teachers…the righteous and the pious…. From where do we take the tears to cry over them? Who has the strength to cry for them?"

Steven Spielberg: "We've never had a Remembrance Day quite like this. But today, on Yom HaShoah, we gather for our first-ever virtual March of the Living. And I wish we could all be together in person. But what's important is that we are together now. Because this virtual gathering not only gives us a chance to remember the horrors we faced in the past, it also shines a light on the struggles that lie ahead and those we face as a community this very day. The work we are doing – which is your work – is already having a generational impact. So for that I can only say thank you. Thank you for your bravery. Thank you for your commitment to the March of the Living. And thank you for gathering today to look back, as we continue the vital work of ensuring a better future."

So to the survivors among you: Your stories are safe with us. They remind not only of your unwavering courage, but also that the days ahead are going to be filled with light and hope."

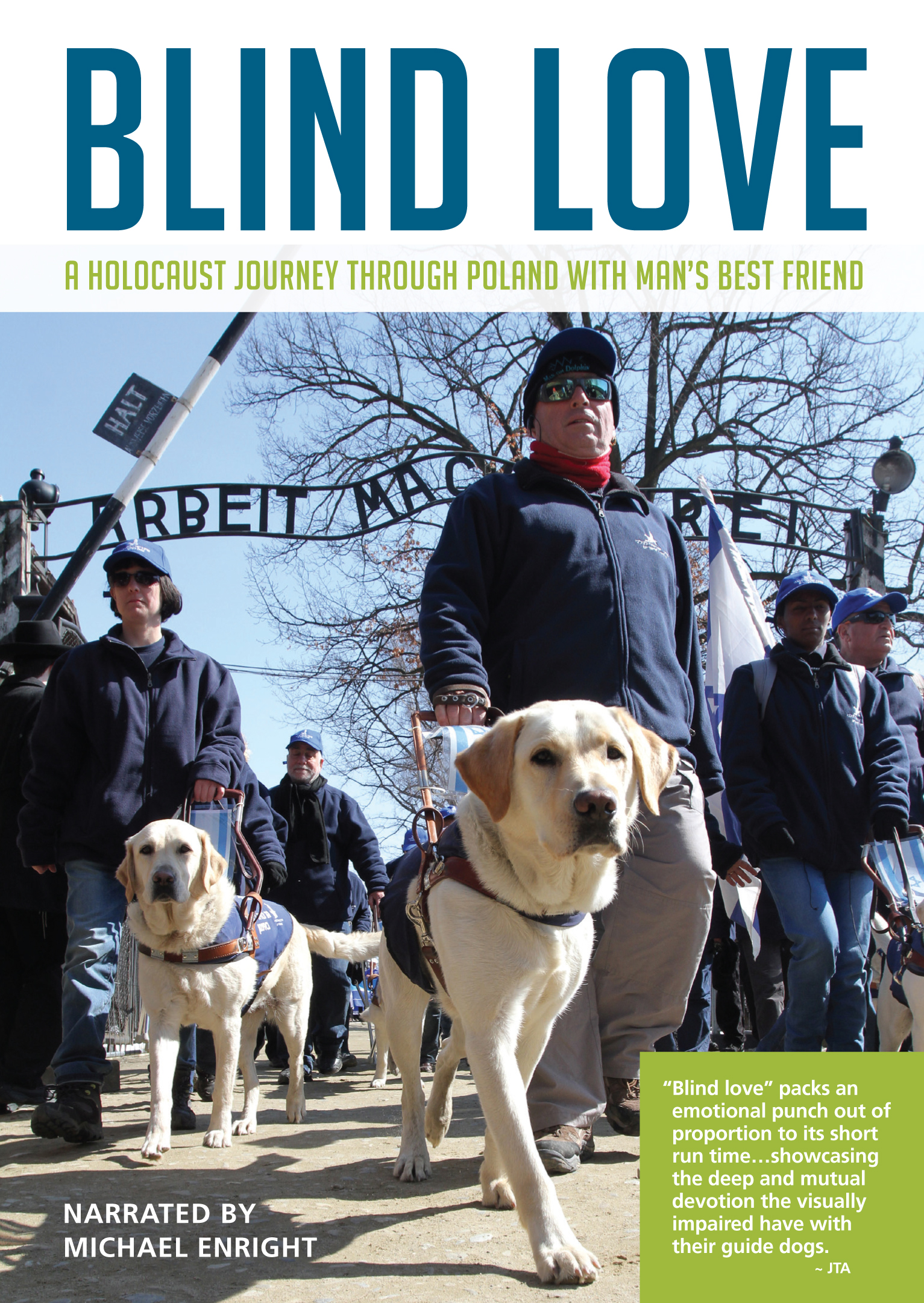

in late 2015 Blind Love was released. A documentary film about six blind Israelis traveling to Poland with the help of their guide dogs on the March of the Living to learn about the Holocaust. The blind participants and their guide dogs marched from Auschwitz-Birkenau in memory of the victims of Nazi genocide and against prejudice, intolerance and hate.

The film premiered during Holocaust Education Week in Toronto, with the co-sponsorship of the Toronto Jewish Film Festival. It was also broadcast on the CBC's Canadian speciality channel Documentary in late 2015 and then again in 2017 on Holocaust Remembrance Day, as well as in Israel on its main station Channel 10 (Israel) on the same day. The film also was broadcast on PBS in the United States.

"Voices of Liberation" (2015) includes Holocaust survivors sharing their moments of liberation, 70 years later. The documentary premiered in Auschwitz-Birkenau on 'Yom HaShoah' (Holocaust Memorial Day), 16 April 2015, at the conclusion of the March of the Living. The film was directed by award-winning director Matthew Shoychet with music by Canadian composer Ryan Shore. Archival footage was provided by the Toronto Holocaust Museum, March of the Living and the USC Shoah Foundation.

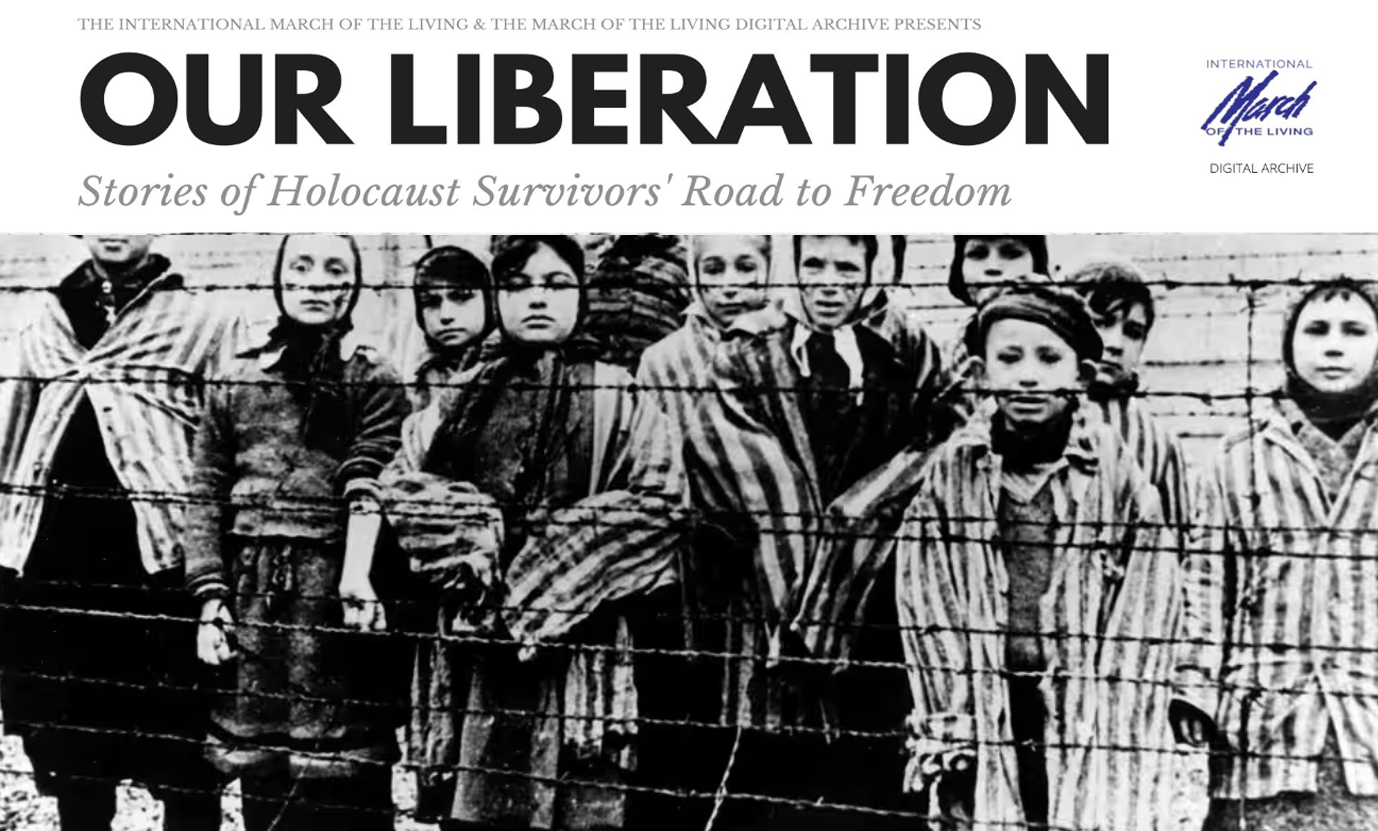

The film "Our Liberation: Stories of Holocaust Survivors Road to Freedom" was premiered on i24NEWS by International March of the Living and the March on International Holocaust Remembrance Day 2021.

The movie depicts the emotional experiences of six Holocaust survivors as they return to the moment when Allied troops liberated the Nazi concentration camps, granting them the long-awaited freedom.

Naomi Wise directed and produced the documentary. The film highlights the personal stories of Holocaust survivors who participated in the March of the Living. The survivors featured are Miriam Ziegler, Faigie Libman, Ernest Ehrmann, and Joe Mandel, as well as the late Robert Engel Z"L and Howard Kleinberg Z"L.

"Witness: Passing the Torch of Holocaust Memory to New Generations", directed by Naomi Wise, premiered on i24 News on International Holocaust Survivors Day, on 24 June 2021. The event marked the first ever international Holocaust Survivor Day, honoring the resilience, courage and contributions of Holocaust Survivors.

The film, shot on location on the March of the Living in Poland, draws on the most poignant moments captured between survivors and students since 1988. March of the Living Survivors featured in the film include Lillian Boraks-Nemetz, Judy Cohen, Max Eisen, Max Glauben, Bill Glied, Pinchas Gutter, Denise Hans, Anna Heilman, Mania Hudy, Max Iland, Howard Kleinberg, Nate Leipciger, Faigie Libman, Sol Nayman, Edward Mosberg, Irving Roth, Rena Schondorf, Albert Silwin, Stefania Sitbon, Sally Wasserman, Elie Wiesel, Helen Yurmas, Miriam Zacrojcyk, and Sidney Zoltak. "Saving the World Entire: Rescuers During the Holocaust" (2023), directed by Naomi Wise, premiered on i24 News on International Holocaust Remembrance Day on 27 January 2023

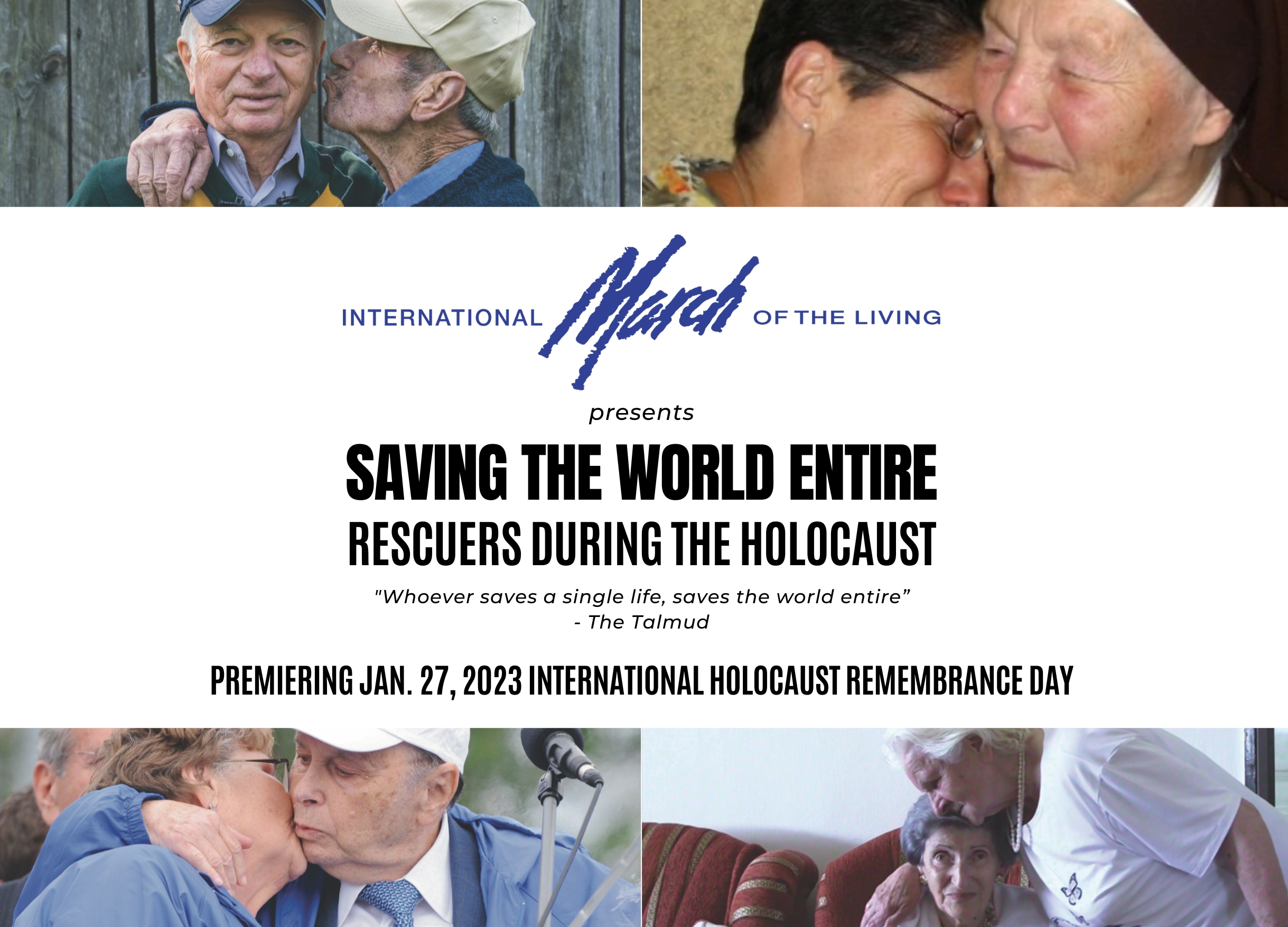

27 January, the anniversary of the liberation of Auschwitz, is globally recognized as International Holocaust Remembrance Day. Saving the World Entire profiles the courage of four Righteous Among the Nations, who risked their lives to save Jews during the Holocaust. Archival testimony – provided by USC Shoah Foundation and March of the Living – focuses on four Polish rescuers whose stories have been shared with March of the Living students. The Polish rescuers – all honoured at Yad Vashem as Righteous Among the Nations – are Zygmunt Krynski, Sister Klara Jaroszynska, Czeslawa Zak, and Krystyna Puchalski-Maciejewskai. The Holocaust survivors they rescued who share their story in the film are Sidney Zoltak, Eva Kuper, Olga Kost & Felix Zandman.

In 2024 coinciding with International Holocaust Remembrance Day, International March of the Living released two Holocaust documentaries related to the Kindertransport:

"Journey of Hope": Retracing the Kindertransport after 85 Years" is a documentary featuring three Kindertransport survivors, Walter Bingham (100) Paul Alexander (85) and George Shefi (92), retracing the journey they took to escape Germany as children 85 years ago after the Kristallnacht pogrom.

The film premiered on 24 January 2024 at the Israeli President's Residence with the attendance of President Isaac Herzog and First Lady Michal Herzog and nine Kindertransport survivors, including Mirjam Beit Talmi Szpiro, who was both a Kindertransport survivor as well as a survivor of the Hamas attack on Israel on 7 October 2023, at Kibbutz Zikim. The film was broadcast on i24News.

In January 2024, International March of the Living released the film "If We Never See Each Other Again", a documentary based on interviews with Kindertransport survivors from the USC Shoah Foundation, marking 85 years since the start of the first Kindertransport. The film was aired on JBS.

=== Heroes of the Holocaust: 80 Years Since Liberation ===
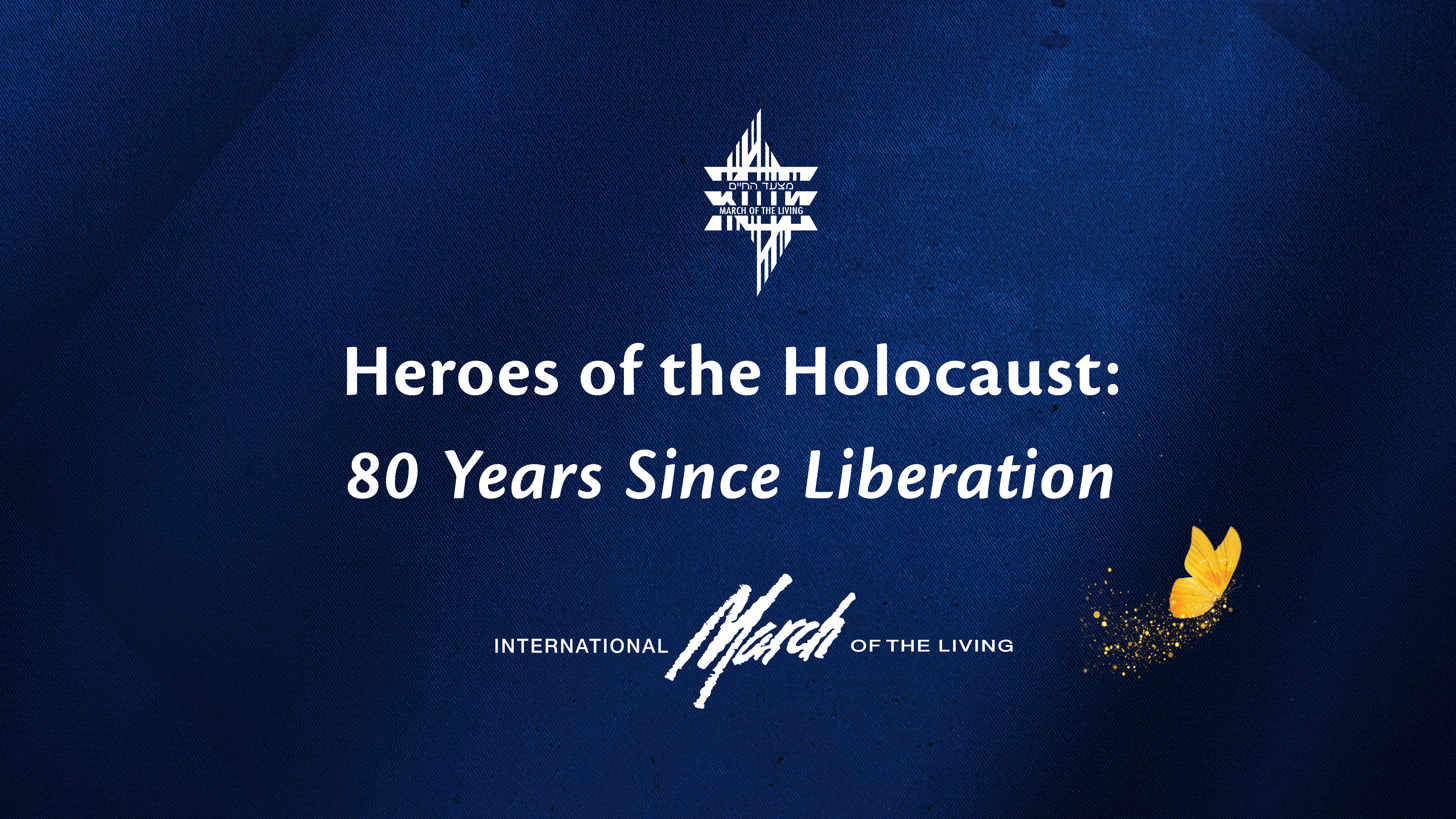

On June 4, 2025, Holocaust Survivor Day, the International March of the Living premiered the documentary, Heroes of the Holocaust: 80 Years Since Liberation on i24 News and its YouTube channel. This film commemorated the 80th anniversary of the liberation of Nazi concentration camps and the end of World War II. The film was directed and edited by Naomi Wise and co-executive produced by Revital Yakin Krakovsky and Eli Rubenstein. Preceding the broadcast, interviews with Michel Gourary, Director of the European March of the Living, and Holocaust survivor Irene Shashar Lewkowiczc provided additional context.

The documentary featured poignant footage of 80 Holocaust survivors from Israel and the Diaspora participating in the 2025 March of the Living at Auschwitz. It also included appearances by former October 7 hostages who joined the survivors in the March. Merrill Eisenhower, great-grandson of General Dwight D. Eisenhower, participated in the film, highlighting his ancestor's commitment to documenting Nazi atrocities to ensure they would never be forgotten or denied.

In 2026, Nate Leipciger is featured in a documentary film, returning to Auschwitz-Birkenau with the March of the Living at the age of 98. Marking his 22nd time accompanying and participating the program, the documentary filmed during the visit followed him as he shared testimony at sites connected to his imprisonment, including his separation from his mother and sister and the role his father played in helping him survive.

=== More Documentary films ===
Title	Subject
The Choice is Ours: Courageous Acts of Medical Professionals During the Holocaust	Medical professionals during the Holocaust
Full Circle – Ukrainian Family Saves Jewish Woman During Holocaust – 80 Years Later Kindness Repaid	Rescue during the Holocaust
United We Stand: Black Soldiers Liberating Hitler's Camps and Jewish Activists in Civil Rights Movement	Black soldiers, liberation of Nazi camps, and civil rights activism
It Was The Right Thing To Do	Holocaust rescue and moral courage
Point of No Return: The Nuremberg Laws	The Nuremberg Laws
Nuremberg Trials – Staying the Hand of Vengeance	The Nuremberg Trials
100,000 Souls: The Legacy of Raoul Wallenberg	Raoul Wallenberg
Czeslawa & Olga	Holocaust remembrance
Twice Liberated	Liberation and survivor testimony
Candles of Kindness	Holocaust remembrance
Auschwitz-Birkenau: 70 Years After Liberation; A Warning to Future Generations	Auschwitz-Birkenau
Lay Down Your Arms	Holocaust remembrance
Requiem for the Warsaw Ghetto	Warsaw Ghetto
Live and Die with Honor: The Story of the Warsaw Ghetto Uprising	Warsaw Ghetto Uprising
I Am Anne Frank	Anne Frank
There's Always A Better Tomorrow	Nate Leipciger

== 2020–2021 cancellation due to COVID-19 ==
For the first time since its inception in 1988, the March of the Living program to Poland and Israel was cancelled in 2020 and 2021 due to the COVID-19 pandemic. In its place, an online virtual program was implemented instead in 2020 and 2021 The in-person March of the Living resumed in 2022, though some groups cancelled because of the Russian invasion of Ukraine.

== 2024 March of the Living ==
The 2024 marked the 80th anniversary of the destruction of Hungarian Jewry during the Holocaust. More than 20 of the survivors who led the march were from Hungary. The commemoration also included a related march in Budapest, beginning at the Dohány Street Synagogue and ending at Keleti railway station, followed by a symbolic “Train of the Living” to Auschwitz. The Auschwitz Museum noted approximately 430,000 Jews were deported from Hungary to Auschwitz in 1944, with about 330,000 murdered in gas chambers shortly after selection. It was also the first March of the Living after the October 7, 2023 Hamas attacks in Israel. Reuters described the 2024 event as taking place “in the shadow” of October 7, with Holocaust survivors personally affected by the attacks among those participating.

n a 2024 letter to Canadian March of the Living participants, Holocaust survivor and educator, Nate Leipciger, described the program as a form of on-site Holocaust education. He emphasized that participants who hear survivor testimony at Auschwitz-Birkenau become responsible for carrying the memory of the Holocaust to future generations.

== The 2025 March of the Living: 80 Year Commemoration ==
The 2025 International March of the Living took place on April 24 (Holocaust Remembrance Day), marking the 80th anniversary of the liberation of the camps and the end of WWII. Eighty Holocaust Survivors, 40 from Israel and 40 from the Diaspora, attended the March of the Living on the 80th anniversary of their liberation.

The event was the largest in recent history, and brought more than 8,000 participants from over 40 countries, including Holocaust survivors, Israeli hostages who had been released, bereaved families, students, and dignitaries. Participants gathered to commemorate the victims of the Holocaust and promote Holocaust education and remembrance. Israeli President Isaac Herzog and Polish President Andrzej Duda led the march, walking side by side through the infamous "Arbeit macht frei" gate at Auschwitz. Herzog emphasized the relevance of the Holocaust's lessons, by saying, "Although after the Holocaust we vowed, 'Never again,' today, even as we stand here, the souls of dozens of Jews again yearn within a cage," (a reference to the Israeli hostages currently held by Hamas).

A delegation of 60 leaders in law enforcement from the United Kingdom, the United States, Europe, and Africa participated in the March, as part of a new training program to equip law enforcement officials with resources to recognize bias, oppose antisemitism and human rights violations. called "Operationalizing Never Again: The Role of Law Enforcement in the Holocaust and Contemporary Genocide." This initiative was put together by Rutgers University's Miller Center and the University of Virginia's Center for Public Safety and Justice.

Award-winning author, speaker, and notable child survivor of the Holocaust, Susanne M Reyto, spoke out in an article in March 2025 about her childhood in Budapest, her father being imprisoned in 1944 during WWII, her father's sister and would-be niece who perished at Birkenau, and two aunts liberated from Ravensbruck and Bergen Belsen. "’ve been to Auschwitz before, but this march holds a special significance. The young generation needs to see this,” Reyto wrote.

Students from high schools worldwide also participated, taking part in educational initiatives that brought them to significant historical landmarks like the Nozyk Synagogue and the Warsaw Ghetto. These immersive experiences aimed to enrich their knowledge of the Holocaust and highlight its ongoing relevance today. Nate Liepciger participated for the 21st time, while other survivors were there for the first time.

The Menomadin Foundation led a special delegation of October 7 survivors and bereaved families to the March of the Living. The delegation included freed hostages from Gaza, bereaved families, and residents of the Gaza Envelope communities, participating and interacting with Holocaust survivors and their descendants. Freed hostage, Agam Berger and Daniel Weiss, whose parents were murdered on Oct. 7, performed a duet during the ceremony in Auschwitz-Birkenau on Holocaust Remembrance Day.

=== Post-March activism ===
On August 5, 2025, International March of the Living organized a gathering in Tel Aviv with Holocaust survivors who had participated in the 2025 March, to meet with freed hostages and family members of those still held captive in Gaza. The event was put together after pictures of hostages, Evyatar David and Rom Braslavski were released to the public, showing their signs of declining health. The survivors on site implied urgency in their return, stating, "It’s time to bring them all home; they don't have much time." Survivors provided their own testimonies relating the condition of these two hostages, seen in recent pictures, to their own experiences during the Holocaust and in the camps.

=== Eisenhower’s great-grandson meets Holocaust Survivor born in concentration camp ===
At an assembly on February 24, 2025, put together by International March of the Living and the Eisenhower family, a new partnership was announced between the organization and the Eisenhower family. The event was co-hosted by known philanthropists, Josh and Marjory Harris, founders of Harris Philanthropies. In attendance was Israeli Ambassador to the U.S. Yechiel Leiter.

The event held in Washington, DC launched a new initiative to help support Holocaust Survivors attend the March of the Living 2025 in Poland to interact and march with participants. In 2024, the Claims Conference data stated approximately 245,000 Jewish Holocaust survivors. The organizers of thie gathering pointed out, “this may be one of the last opportunities for young participants to walk alongside them and hear their firsthand testimonies.”

The event featured England-based Holocaust survivor, Eva Clarke, who was born in Mauthausen concentration camp one week before the allied liberation. Also, in attendance to meet with Clarke was Merrill Eisenhower, great-grandson of President Dwight Eisenhower, Commander of the US Forces who liberated the Mauthausen camp and others in Austria.

In a press release it was announced that Merrill Eisenhower will be marching with Eva Clarke on the March of the Living this coming April between Auschwitz and Birkenau. Clarke was quoted saying, “I am the infant your great-grandfather and the American soldiers saved…..Had they not arrived in time, I would not be standing here today.”

Merrill Eisenhower shared, “There is no greater privilege than continuing the legacy of my great-grandfather, who not only led the liberation of thousands of Jews from a cruel fate, but also ensured the world bore witness to the horrors of the Holocaust by ordering everything to be documented. To march in the March of the Living alongside survivors, whose lives were saved thanks to him, is a solemn duty. We must keep telling their stories, stand against Holocaust denial, and fight antisemitism and intolerable in all of its manifestation wherever it appears.”

The 2025 March of the Living will mark the 80th anniversary since the end of WWII in Europe and the liberation of hundreds of thousands of Jews from Nazi camps, ghettos, and hiding places across Europe.

=== European March of the Living: Ponary, Lithuania (2025) ===
March of the Living from Vilnius to Ponary is also referred to as the European March of the Living (EMOTL), held on 19 September 2025 with hundreds of participants including students, ambassadors, Lithuanian officials, and members of the Jewish community. It began with a ceremony at the site of the former Vilnius Ghetto and followed by a solemn march to the mass graves at Ponary.

Survivors, Arnold Clevs and Aviva Ptack participated by attending and also by sharing their personal testimonies with the march participants. Clevs gave remarks recalling his childhood experiences in Lithuania during the Holocaust, including being seized by Lithuanian soldiers in 1941, deportation, imprisonment, and survival through multiple camps. He concluded with a message urging people to “help the State of Israel” and to not repeat the mistakes of the past. Ptack also addressing the group, recounting her family's fate, her survival through adoption by a non-Jewish family, and her later discovery of her background. She spoke about the difficulty of retelling her story but emphasized its importance for educating younger generations.

In 1940, the Soviet Red Army entered Lithuania, and the country was subsequently annexed into the Soviet Union. The process of Sovietization had a significant impact on the Jewish population: many lost their businesses, property, and means of livelihood. Soviet policies, rooted in communist ideology, also targeted religion; Jewish religious life was suppressed, and synagogues were closed. During this period, thousands of Jews were deported to remote regions of the Soviet Union, where many did not survive.

The pre-war Jewish population in Lithuania was between 160,000 and 210,000 (7% of the population). by 1944, almost 90% were murdered. One of the highest victim rates in Nazi-occupied Europe. Many of these deaths happened very rapidly in 1941 during mass shootings. During the Ponary (Panerai) massacre, approximately 70,000 Jews murdered.

==== Historical sites ====
Ponary (Paneriai) is a site near Vilnius where large‐scale massacres took place (between July 1941 and August 1944). Approximately 100,000 people were murdered there. Approx 70,000 Jews, along with Poles, Russians (including POWs), by Nazi forces and local collaborators.

The Ninth Fort, originally constructed in the late 19th century as part of a series of fortifications near Kaunas (formerly Kovno), became one of the most notorious sites of mass killings during the Holocaust in Lithuania. Located about four miles from the city center, it was used by German occupation forces and their Lithuanian collaborators between June 1941 and the summer of 1944 as an execution site. During this period, more than 50,000 Jews were murdered there.

The first Ponary March in Lithuania took place in 2007, and since then it has been held regularly (it sometimes rotates among European sites)

== 2026 March of the Living ==
The 33rd March of the Living was held under the theme “Marching Against Antisemitism,” highlighting recent acts of antisemitic violence in Sydney, Manchester, and Washington, D.C. Approximately 7,000 participants from international delegations took part in the March, including former Israeli hostages kidnapped by Hamas on Oct. 7. 2023.

The March began under the main gates at Auschwitz with Baruch Adler, Co-founder & Vice Chairman, addressing participants: “We stand before this gate, Auschwitz. A gate through which Jews were forced into hell. A gate that led millions of Jews to their destruction. And now we cross the same gate. No not as they were driven in, but as Jews who walk out upright, confident, unbroken…We march for the murdered Jews. We march for the slaughtered Jews. We march to pay respect to the Righteous Among the Nations. And with every step, millions of Jewish souls walk beside us calling to us, "Do not let us be forgotten…. And today, when antisemitism rises again, when Jews are targeted for being Jews, this march is more than memory. It is responsibility. “.

The March was led by Sylvan Adams, president of World Jewish Congress Israel and the son of Holocaust survivors, alongside approx. 40 Holocaust survivors from the Diaspora and 10 Holocaust survivors from Israel, in what the organization described as “a living symbol of memory, resilience, and continuity." Several of those survivors helped light the first torch dedicated to combating antisemitism, along with U.S. special envoy Rabbi Yehuda Kaploun.

The 2026 program also commemorated Elie Wiesel, an Auschwitz survivor and recipient of the 1986 Nobel Peace Prize, on the 10th anniversary of his death. Organizers recalled Wiesel's emphasis on memory, hope and bearing witness as part of the ceremony's broader message of Holocaust remembrance. Co-founder and chair of the program, Shmuel Rosenman, said, “we stand here today in Auschwitz Birkenau. A place where the ground remembers, and where silence still speaks.”

Phyllis Greenberg Heideman, President of International March of the Living, said, “I believe that those who dwell in this miserable place are grateful that we have continued our emotional annual visit and remembrance and respect and have proven yet again against all obstacles that they are not forgotten.“

The March was also co-led by survivors of global antisemitic attacks in 2025, including Eva Wietzen, a survivor of the Bondi Beach Hanukkah attack in Sydney; Yoni Finley, who was wounded in a Yom Kippur shooting at a synagogue in Manchester; and Abbie Talmoud and Catherine Szkop, survivors of a May 2025 shooting at the Israeli embassy in Washington, D.C.

The planned Israeli delegation of approximately 1,000 to 1,500 participants was unable to attend the 2026 March of the Living due to air travel restrictions and security concerns during the ongoing conflict with Iran. Despite this issue, a smaller group of Israeli Holocaust survivors was nevertheless able to travel to Poland and participate in the march.

Holocaust survivors Tova Friedman and Nate Leipciger spoke during the Yom Hashoah ceremony, warning about rising antisemitism. Leipciger, a Canadian survivor, specifically referenced increasing antisemitism in Canada, while both survivors emphasized the need for younger generations to remain vigilant and actively confront hatred. For Leipciger, 2026 marked his 22nd time participating, leading and sharing his experiences. He also lit the "Next Generation" torch during the opening ceremony.

Harry Rozendaal, a 95-year-old Dutch Holocaust survivor, joined the Toronto March of the Living Adult Delegation and spoke to participants at Auschwitz. Rozendaal, who had travelled to Poland to honour the memory of his mother Catherina, murdered at Auschwitz, died in Warsaw on April 22, 2026, after the conclusion of the trip. A Canadian article commented on his participation in the March of the Living, saying “his last act was to honour his mother’s memory in Auschwitz.”

Survivor participation in the March also included multigenerational family delegations. Ellen Tissenbaum, a Dutch Holocaust survivor born in 1936, participated in March of the Living shortly before her 90th birthday with her son, grandson and niece. Tissenbaum attended with 100 high school students, served as a bus captain, and found her mother's name among records of those murdered at Auschwitz. She said the trip encouraged her to publicly share her Holocaust story after years of silence.

=== Law Enforcement Delegation ===
The 2026 March of the Living included an international law-enforcement delegation organized under the banner “Not On Our Watch: Operationalising Never Again.” The program brought more than 130 global senior law-enforcement figures and police executives to Germany and Poland. It was led by Paul Goldenberg, deputy director of the Rutgers Miller Center on Policing and Community Resilience, and Marvin Haiman, executive director of the University of Virginia Center for Public Safety and Justice.

Before arriving in Poland, many of the law-enforcement leaders gathered in Berlin, where they launched a multinational initiative focused on democratic policing, community protection, early-threat detection, and intelligence-sharing. The delegation signed a declaration in Berlin committing to strengthening cooperation around those issues. Media reported that the delegation's participation linked Holocaust remembrance with prevention, legitimacy, and the protection of vulnerable communities.

The delegation then travelled to Poland and joined March of the Living at Auschwitz-Birkenau, marching alongside Holocaust survivors, victims of recent terror attacks, and approximately 7,000 other participants. Delegates also heard from Holocaust survivor Allan J. Hall and from victims or witnesses of recent antisemitic attacks.

Goldenberg told The Jewish Chronicle that his Jewish identity and more than 25 years as a serving police officer gave him a “dual lens” through which to approach the issue. He also said that “policing was a missing component in Holocaust education,” adding that if the lesson of the Holocaust is “never again,” law enforcement must be part of that commitment.

Additional law-enforcement participants included Major Keri Adcock of the Denver Sheriff Department, who wrote that visiting Auschwitz and marching from Auschwitz to Birkenau led her to reflect on confinement, human dignity, dehumanization, and the responsibilities of law-enforcement systems. Another participant, Capt. Jillian McCoy of the Webster Groves Police Department, was one of six scholarship recipients selected for the program and was among the roughly 130 executive law-enforcement leaders who joined the 2026 delegation.

=== Closing ceremonies ===
The 2026 closing ceremony consisted of Holocaust survivors, Jewish youth and thousands of participants. The ceremony included a violin performance by Agam Berger, a survivor of the October 7 Hamas attack, using a Holocaust era violin donated to Yad Vashem by Israeli relatives of a Holocaust survivor. Participants also included 88-year-old Holocaust survivor Irene Shashar, born Ruth Lewkowicz in Warsaw, who survived the war as a hidden child after her father was killed by the Germans. Shashar was quoted saying, “I am here because Hitler did not win.” The ceremony also featured Holocaust survivor Hannah Yakin and Wilhelm Bernard Hazan, who had been born in hiding in the Netherlands and saved through the efforts of Yakin's father, Johan van Hulst one of the Righteous Among the Nations; Yakin lit a Torch of Hope at the ceremony.

=== 2026 Reflections on the March ===
After completing the March various students had essays published, reflecting on their participation in March of the Living in Poland, one student described the visit to Holocaust sites as a firsthand encounter with the material evidence of genocide. 22-year-old student Lottie Cannon reflected that March of the Living left her with a sense of responsibility as part of a generation that may be among the last to hear Holocaust survivors’ stories directly. She described the experience being shaped by visits to Auschwitz-Birkenau and by conversations, survivor testimony, and the challenge of preserving memory after first-hand witnesses are gone. Southbank University JSoc president Rebecca Saunders described the March as an experience that combined Holocaust remembrance, survivor testimony, Jewish identity, and a call to challenge hatred.

Imran Igra described joining a SHARAKA delegation of Muslim leaders from several countries at Auschwitz-Birkenau for March of the Living. He wrote that the experience shifted his understanding of the Holocaust from general awareness to a sense of responsibility, framing the visit as an example of interfaith Holocaust education and Jewish-Muslim dialogue.

== 2026 March of the Living Budapest ==
After the March at Auschwitz-Birkenau in Poland a month prior, a separate March of the Living commemoration was held in Budapest, Hungary. The event honoured the victims of the Holocaust and focused on themes of remembrance, opposition to antisemitism, and the responsibility of new generations to resist hatred and public indifference. The March proceeded along the Id. Antall József embankment and the Carl Lutz embankment, beginning with the sounding of the shofar and concluding at the Memorial to the Rescuers on the Carl Lutz rakpart.

The Budapest march was led by 73 Holocaust survivors travelling in electric vehicles. Participants included Budapest Mayor Gergely Karácsony, Andor Grósz, president of the Federation of Hungarian Jewish Communities and chairman of the board of trustees of the March of the Living Foundation, Israeli ambassador to Hungary Maya Kadosh, politician Dávid Vitézy, and former European affairs minister János Bóka.

Speakers at the event emphasized that the Holocaust should be remembered not only as a historical tragedy, but also as a warning against hatred, exclusion, and indifference. Karácsony warned against attempts to relativize or distort the history of the Holocaust, stating that the Hungarian Holocaust was carried out by the Hungarian state against Hungarian citizens. Grósz said that the March affirmed both remembrance of the dead and the continued visibility of Jewish life, culture, and solidarity in Hungary. Kadosh connected contemporary efforts to combat antisemitism with support for Israel. Budapest Mayor, Gergely Karácsony, spoke out, saying, “The Hungarian Holocaust was carried out by the Hungarian state against Hungarian citizens....did not begin with gas chambers, but with words and hatred.....It is time for all of us in this homeland to find our way back to where we now have the most important task: back to one another.”

== Nuremberg Laws: 90 Year Commemoration: September 2025 ==
On September 15, 2025, the 90th anniversary of the Nuremberg Laws (1935) was marked by a program organized by International March of the Living and the Rutgers University Miller Center on Policing and Community Resilience. Enacted in 1935, the Nuremberg Laws stripped Jews of German citizenship and excluded them from civic life, laying the groundwork for the Holocaust.

The Nuremberg laws excluded Jews from all aspects of civilized life in German society, which later expanded to other people from many different backgrounds. Nuremberg codified antisemitism into law.

Phyllis Greenberg Heideman, president of International March of the Living, emphasized that the laws were a critical early step toward genocide. Paul Miller, founder of the Rutgers Miller Center, noted that the laws later targeted other minorities and underscored the center's work with universities, police, and communities to combat discrimination and uphold the principle of “Never Again.”

A keynote lecture was presented by Stephan Kramer, President of the Agency for the Protection of the Constitution in Thuringia, Germany, which is responsible for monitoring threats to democratic stability. Kramer explained that current forms of extremism bear similarities to those of the past but are often framed in new terminology, such as “ethnopluralism” or “remigration.” He referenced data showing a 23% increase in extremist violence in Germany in 2024, as well as record levels of antisemitic incidents—approximately 5,000 in Germany and 9,300 in the United States. Despite these concerns, Kramer highlighted signs of democratic resilience, including large-scale public demonstrations, legal measures targeting hate groups, and the prohibition of extremist publications. He also underscored the historical significance of Nuremberg—first as the site of the 1935 laws that institutionalized exclusion, and later as the location of the Nuremberg Trials from 1945 to 1946. Together, Miller and Kramer emphasized that remembrance must be paired with education, vigilance, and proactive efforts to defend democracy in order to counter the resurgence of antisemitism and extremism.

== Response to the October 7 attacks on Israel ==
The 2024 March of the Living took place in the aftermath of the Gaza war, and the rise in antisemitism worldwide. 55 Holocaust Survivors took part in the 2024 March of the Living, including 7 Holocaust survivors from Israel, who survived the October 7th attacks. One of them, French Israeli Holocaust survivor Daniel Luz, lit a memorial torch at the March of the Living ceremony stating the following:

"This year, on the sixth of October, we celebrated the kibbutz's 78th birthday. On October 7, we were hostages in our home, when Hamas terrorists entered the kibbutz. We were deathly afraid. It was even scarier than I remember as a child in that war. We, the survivors of the Holocaust, who established a home and a state, which is our great victory over the Nazis and antisemitism, light this torch in memory of those who perished in the Holocaust, and in memory of those murdered on October 7."

Canadian Polish Holocaust survivor Nate Leipciger also spoke at the 2024 ceremony and lit a memorial torch, saying, "My name is Nate Leipciger. I am 96 years old. [ … ] I am marching with you on the 20th march and I hope this is not the last one for me. I stood on this ramp 81 years ago. Every day could have been my death. My family's ashes are spread over all this land. Remember - Jewish rights are also human rights! Yes, I repeat, it's important: Jewish rights are also human rights! Stand up to antisemitism and fight hate and falsehood wherever you are. And, never means now!"

In May 2024, Shmuel Rosenman, co-founder and Chairman of March of the Living, speaking in Krakow, Poland, stated: "The Holocaust remains the most unique and unprecedented tragedy in Jewish and human history. But the events of October 7th, 2023, remind of this grim fact: those same motivations, those same evil intentions, and false accusations that led to the Shoah – they are still with us today, in full force, and in full display."

Phyllis Greenberg Heideman, President of International March of the Living, stated in late 2024, "Last year, on Holocaust Remembrance Day, a delegation of survivors of the October 7 massacre led the 2024 International March of the Living from Auschwitz to Birkenau, highlighting the connection between the events of the Holocaust and those of October 7, recognizing the continuum of antisemitism we face as a people. Just as the Jewish people rose from the ashes of the Holocaust, we will rise from the ashes of October 7," quoting Holocaust survivor Bella Haim, who also joined the 2024 March of the Living."

== Public responses ==
In May 2024, the organization responded to university student groups condemning Israel during global protests. The article stated that these university student-led efforts reflect how antisemitism has evolved—from marginalizing individual Jews and denying them equal standing in society, to delegitimizing the Jewish nation-state and denying it equal status among the nations of the world. In an article, MOTL pointed out parallels to pre-WWII, particularly within academic institutions, where student bodies often displayed extreme hostility toward their Jewish peers, and discriminatory policies like the Numerus Clausus were widespread across Europe, the United States, and Canada.

June 24, 2024, after a protest outside a synagogue in Los Angeles turned to violence, president Joe Biden stated, “I’m appalled by the scenes outside of Adas Torah synagogue in Los Angeles. Intimidating Jewish congregants is dangerous, unconscionable, antisemitic, and un-American...Americans have a right to peaceful protest. But blocking access to a house of worship – and engaging in violence – is never acceptable.” International March of the Living responded to this and other acts across the globe pointing out violence, hate crimes and antisemitism, stating, “The attack on the ‘Adas Torah’ synagogue in Los Angeles and the targeting of Jews there, as well as the attacks on synagogues in Russia, the shocking rape of a Jewish girl in France last week, and the daily threats to Jews worldwide, all lead to one grim conclusion: Jewish blood is cheap. Anti-Semitism has become normalized and attacks against Jews have become normalized.... These are all attempts to intimidate and push Jews out of the public sphere – a phenomenon we know all too well from history. We call on the authorities in countries across the world to come to their senses quickly because Jewish blood is being shed with impunity.”

In June 2024, International March of the Living publicly denounced a summer youth program showing automatic weapons on their flyers. The program was organized by Solidarity for Palestinian Human Rights at McGill University. March of the Living's statement was, "The International March of the Living condemns in the strongest possible terms the plans announced by Solidarity for Palestinian Human Rights (SPHR) at McGill University for a summer youth program promising "revolutionary" education." The Office of the President and Vice-Chancellor at McGill University released a statement addressing their concerns and "appealing to public safety authorities." MOTL quoted Holocaust Survivor, Angele Orosz: "What's happening today at McGill is so frightening for me. I was born in Auschwitz-Birkenau. I came to Canada to escape antisemitism. It's unbearable that my grandchildren have to go through what I escaped Hungary for."

Commenting on the McGill protests, Chairman Shmuel Rosenman and President Phyllis Greenberg Heideman, issued the following statement: "Education for young people should never encourage the use of violence. When actions by students on campus, promoted by social media companies, make Holocaust survivors fear setting foot on campus and fear for the future of their grandchildren – it is clear that both the university and social media organizations have lost their way. Now it is high time to find their way back."

=== Commemoration of Babyn Yar ===
On 29 September 2025, the International March of the Living and the Babyn Yar Holocaust Memorial Center commemorated the 84th anniversary of the Babyn Yar massacre, in which 33,771 Jews were murdered in Kyiv on 29–30 September 1941. At a ceremony at the massacre site, the organisations read the names of 1,031 previously unidentified victims, whose identities had been established through archival research. The ceremony included the Kaddish memorial prayer. A parallel event at the National Library of Israel in Jerusalem featured a reading of the names and a discussion about Holocaust remembrance during wartime.

In September 2026, marking the massacre’s 85th anniversary, Revital Yakin Krakovsky, CEO of March of the Living Israel, published an opinion articleadvocating greater attention to the mass shootings of Jews in Eastern Europe, often described as the “Holocaust by bullets”. She argued that remembrance should include the victims’ names, Jewish identities and prewar communities, alongside the circumstances of their murder. Drawing on her work with March of the Living, she emphasised visits to historical sites, survivor testimony and archival research as ways to counter Holocaust distortion and the suppression of memory.

=== Opposition to the Heidenau Stolpersteine ban (2026) ===
In September 2026, International March of the Living called on Heidenau, Germany, to reverse a council decision prohibiting new Stolpersteine memorials in public streets and sidewalks. The motion, supported by representatives of the Christian Democratic Union and Alternative for Germany, proposed concentrating future commemoration at the town’s North Cemetery.

Heidenau’s first Stolperstein was installed on 24 August 2021 to commemorate Paul Gröger, the town’s mayor until 1933, who died by suicide after imprisonment and abuse by the Nazis at Hohnstein concentration camp. By September 2026, Heidenau had five stones, all personally installed by the project’s founder, artist Gunter Demnig.

The decision drew criticism from politicians, Jewish leaders and Gunter Demnig. Holocaust survivor Charlotte Knobloch, president of the Jewish community in Munich, described removing memorials from the cityscape as “completely the wrong approach”. Although she opposed Stolpersteine herself, she emphasized that decentralized remembrance should remain visible in public spaces as an essential part of Germany’s culture of remembrance.

March of the Living described the decision as a “wake-up call” and expressed concern that political interests were pushing the memory of Nazi victims out of public life. Its statement emphasized the importance of commemorating victims where they had lived and Germany’s responsibility to confront Nazi crimes. The organization called for stronger commemoration and urged German leaders and citizens to oppose efforts to conceal this history.

Nate Leipciger at Congregation Habonim Toronto in the new Rabbi office, after completing a short film for students with March of the Living (Aug, 2026)

=== Nate Leipciger: 2026 Open letter to Jewish students ===
On September 1, 2026, the 87th anniversary of the outbreak of World War II, the International March of the Living published an open letter and accompanying video from Holocaust survivor and educator Nate Leipciger addressed to Jewish students beginning the academic year. Responding to antisemitism on university campuses following the October 7 attacks, Leipciger distinguished legitimate criticism of the Israeli government from the harassment, exclusion or collective blaming of Jewish students. Drawing upon his survival of Auschwitz-Birkenau and nearly three decades accompanying students on the March of the Living, he encouraged students to learn Jewish history, remain proud of their identity, support one another and build alliances against racism and other forms of discrimination. He urged them to confront hatred with moral courage while refusing to allow antisemitism to define either their identity or their future.

== See also ==
- Edward Mosberg, Holocaust survivor, one of the biggest supporters of the International March of the Living, often attending the march wearing his original concentration camp uniform.
- Shimon Farkas
- Shmuel Rosenman
- Frank Lowy
- USC Shoa Foundation
- Blind Love (2015 documentary)
