= Faculté Libre de Médecines Naturelles et d'Ethnomédecine =

Professional training organization in France

flmne
- Company type: private company
- Industry: Aromatherapy
- Founded: 1987
- Founder: Jean-Pierre Willem
- Headquarters: Paris
- Key people: Jean-Pierre Willem (Chairman & CEO); Hubert Willem (Exec. VP)
- Website: flmne.org

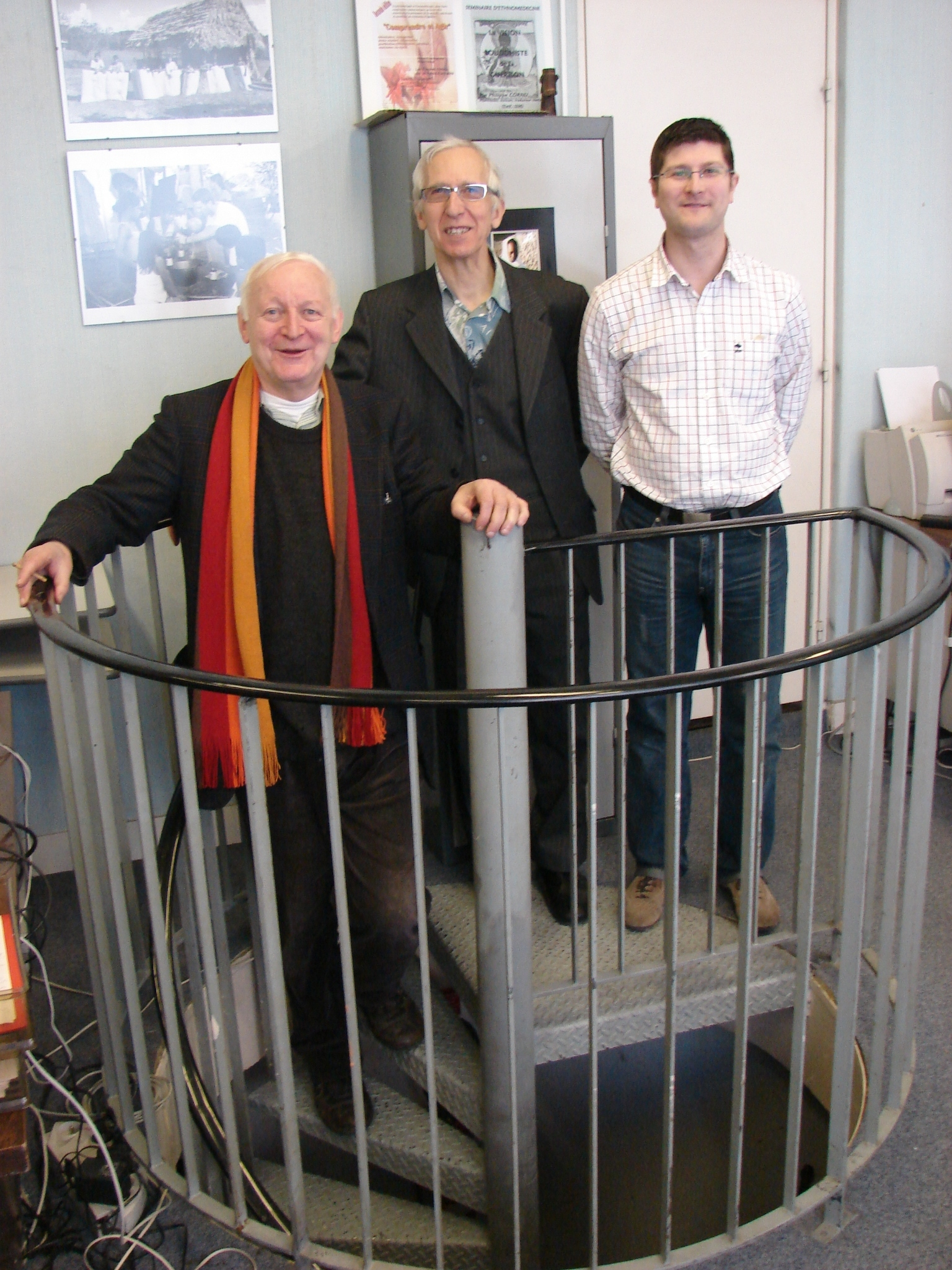
Jean-Pierre Willem (left), Jean-Claude Rodet (center) and Hubert Willem (right), 10 April 2008 at FLMNE in Paris.

The Faculté Libre de Médecines Naturelles et d'Ethnomédecine (FLMNE) is a professional training organization, based in Paris (France) founded by Jean-Pierre Willem in 1987. It was transformed into a company in 1997. According to Hubert Willem, every true medicine should work to lose because it is aimed to give health to patients.

== See also ==
- Heilpraktiker
- Medecins Aux Pieds Nus
