= Anh Tuan Dinh-Xuan =

French physiologist

Anh Tuan Dinh-Xuan (born 1958 in Saigon (now Ho Chi Minh City), Vietnam) is a French researcher, doctor and university professor. He manages the hospital department of Physiology - Practical examinations at Cochin hospital in Paris. His research concerns the physiology of the respiratory system and the physiopathology of pulmonary diseases.

== Biography ==
Tuan Dinh Xuan Anh left his home country at the age of 11 with his family to follow his father (Tho Dinh-Xuan), an academic and Vietnamese diplomat, to his post in Morocco. Arriving in France in 1973, he pursued his secondary school studies at Louis-le-Grand high school in Paris. A few years later, he chose to study medicine in Paris. He obtained his Doctorate of Medicine in 1985 in the faculty of Cochin – Port Royal. His work was rewarded by a prize for his thesis from Paris Descartes University. His study was completed by a Master of Arts and a Doctorate in Science from the University of Cambridge, United Kingdom in the 1990s.

At the same time, Doctor Dinh began his career as a practitioner in the department of Physiology - Practical Examinations, at the Cochin hospital in Paris, and was authorized to supervise research at the Paris Descartes University where he taught the physiology of respiratory and cardio-vascular cells. He also participated in the supervision of the Master's degree for biology of normal and pathological cells, as well as preclinical and clinical pharmacology.

== Scientific research ==
In the 2000s (decade), Anh Tuan Dinh-Xuan was appointed head of the department of Physiology - Practical Examination at Cochin hospital. At the same time, he was elected a member of the French National Centre for Scientific Research, and joined the committee for that organisation. His research concerned in particular molecular and integrative physiology and the role of nitric oxide in the pathophysiology, diagnosis, and the treatment of respiratory diseases.

Within the Paris Descartes University from 2002 to 2010, Anh Tuan Dinh-Xuan managed the research unit called UPRES, which specialized in Respiratory Biology, Physiology and Pathology. He also managed the University Institute of Health of the University of Corsica. His works have been published in many medical magazines and he has been the editor-in-chief of the European Respiratory Journal.

He is also a member of the editorial committee of the Magazine of Respiratory diseases - official publication of the French Society of Pneumology.

Anh Tuan Dinh-Xuan has been consulted as an expert by several organisations such as the National Institute of Health and Medical Research, the Hospital Programmes for Clinical Research, the French Ministry of Higher Education and Research, the American Heart Association, the European Respiratory Society, the British Lung Foundation, the French Society of Physiology, the Cystic Fibrosis Association, and the French Association against Myopathies.

== Humanitarian activities ==
Dr. Anh Tuan Dinh-Xuan was one of the first French doctors of Vietnamese origin to put a lot into the rescue operations of the boat people in the China Sea organized by Médecins du Monde. Between 1982 and 1987 he undertook several humanitarian missions together with Alain Deloche and Bernard Kouchner. In 1985, Dr. Anh Tuan Dinh-Xuan initiated a joint effort between the Vietnamese humanitarian organization in the United States called the Boat People SOS Committee, based in California, and Médecins du Monde. This initiative permitted the collection of funds from the Vietnamese community in the United States to partially the rescue operations of the Vietnamese boat people from 1985 until 1988 (the year of the last mission of Médecins du Monde in the China Sea).

== Prizes and distinctions ==
- 1985 - Prize-winner of the Faculty of Medicine Cochin-Port-Royal, university thesis price, Silver medal, Paris
- 1990 - Young Investigator Award, American College of Angiology Annual Prize, Atlanta, United States
- 1997 – Clinical Research Prize, Foundation for Medical Research, Paris, France
- 2000 - Excellent Medical Sciences Award, Vietnamese American Medical Research Foundation, Los Angeles, United States

== Educational works ==
- Précis de Physiologie Médicale (Handbook of Medical Physiology), Dinh-Xuan Anh Tuan, Piccin Publishing, Padoue, 1996 and 2003.
- Physiologie, Dinh-Xuan Anh Tuan, Ader JL, Carré F, Duclos M, Kubis N, Mercier J, Mion F, Préfaut C, Roman S. Collection des Abrégés, Masson Publishing, Paris, 2003.
  - Price “First cycle” of the Second International festival of the Medical Book (Organized by the Faculty of Medicine of Amiens, France), EDIMED, 2003.
- Physiologie 320 QCM, Dinh-Xuan Anh Tuan, Ader JL, Carré F, Duclos M, Kubis N, Mercier J, Mion F, Préfaut C, Roman S. Masson Publishing, Paris, 2004.
