= Elvira Bierbach =

German Alt-Med educator

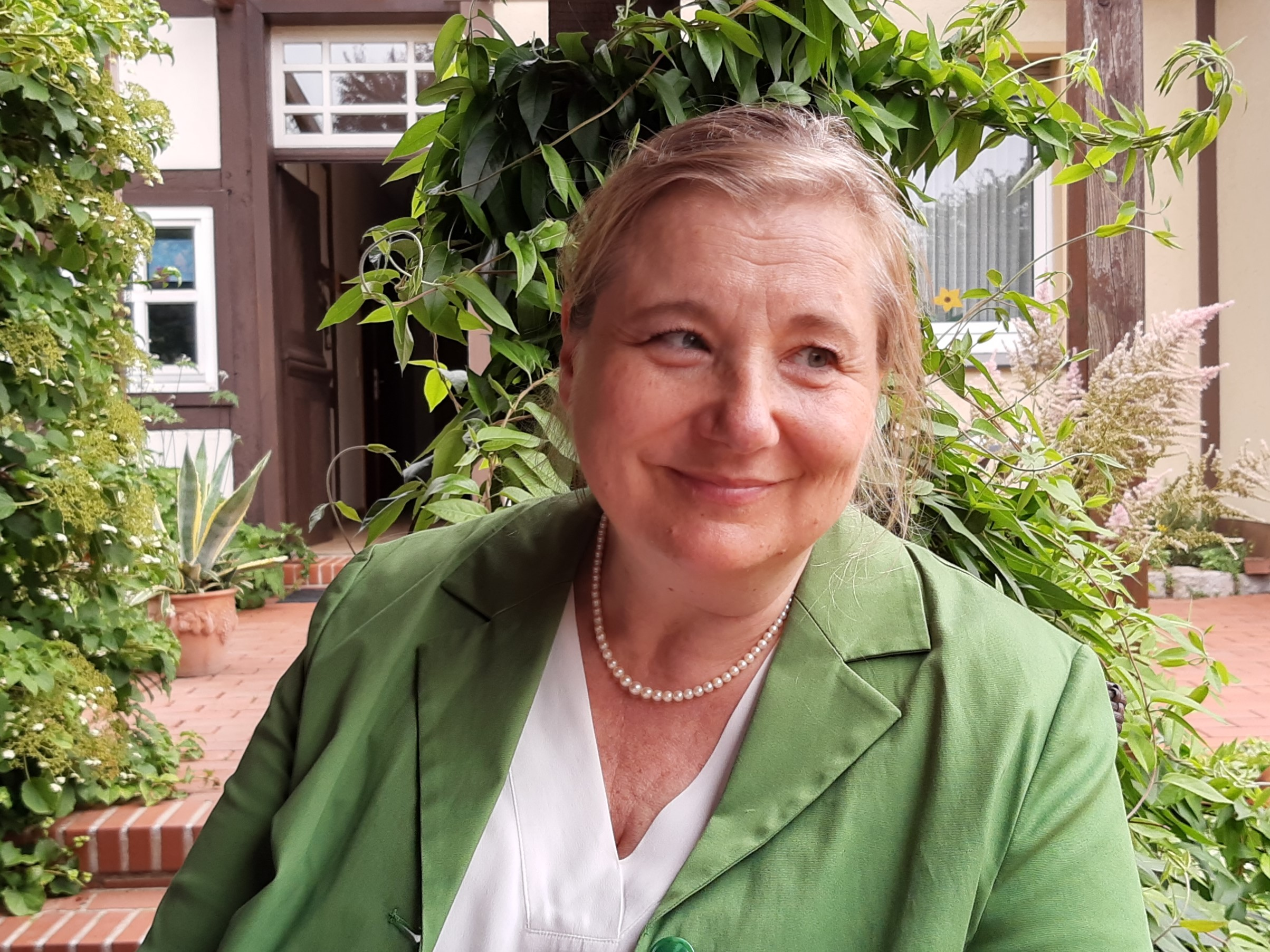
- Elvira Bierbach in 2021
- Occupations: Heilpraktiker; Writer; Editor; School director
- Organizations: Heilpraktikerschule Bierbach; Bund Deutscher Heilpraktiker; Deutsche Heilpraktikerzeitung
- Known for: Naturheilpraxis Heute

Elvira Bierbach is a German heilpraktiker, an alternative medicine practitioner, health educator, writer and editor of related non-fiction books. Since 1992, she has been the director of Heilpraktikerschule Bierbach, a school for alternative medicine in Bielefeld, North Rhine-Westphalia. Bierbach has written and edited alternative medicine books, textbooks, and has lectured in the field. She has published the trade journal Deutsche Heilpraktiker Zeitschrift, and has engaged in related social and political developments.

== Career ==
Bierbach first trained to become a tailor. She became interested in alternative medicine, and took her exam as heilpraktiker in 1991. After running her own practice, she took over a private naturopathic school in Bielefeld in 1992, expanded it and named it Heilpraktikerschule Bierbach. In 1995, the school was accredited as Verbandsschule by the Bund Deutscher Heilpraktiker (BDH), the union of heilpraktiker in Germany. It is one of few BDH certified schools. She became a member of the organisation's advisory board, and has engaged in social and political organizations related to the field.

She has written and edited several books on the subject of alternative medicine including Naturheilpraxis Heute (Practice of natural healing), and has lectured in the field. A revised version of Naturheilpraxis Heute, with an added Lernkompass to help with examinations, appeared in 2021.

Bierbach is editor (Herausgeberin) of the trade journal, Deutsche Heilpraktiker Zeitschrift (German heilpraktiker newspaper). She is responsible for outreach for the Gesamtkonferenz Deutscher Heilpraktikerverbände und Fachgesellschaften, a union of associations of heilpraktiker.

In 2015, Bierbach contributed a section to an exhibition of the Naturwissenschaftliches Museum Flensburg, titled An der Nase herumgeführt, about the biology of the sense of smell.

== Publications ==
- Bierbach, Elvira (2009). Naturheilpraxis heute: Lehrbuch und Atlas (in German). Elsevier, Urban & Fischer Verlag. ISBN 978-3-437-55243-4.
- Bierbach, Elvira (2011). Infektionskrankheiten von A-Z für Heilpraktiker : Infektionsschutzgesetz, Infektiologie, Lernhilfen (in German). Munich, Germany: Urban & Fischer. ISBN 978-3-437-56772-8. OCLC 889312194.
- Bierbach, Elvira; Christ, Gerhard (2021). Naturheilpraxis Heute + Lernkompass Set (in German). Munich, Germany: Elsevier. ISBN 978-3-43-755207-6.
