= Jean Courtial =

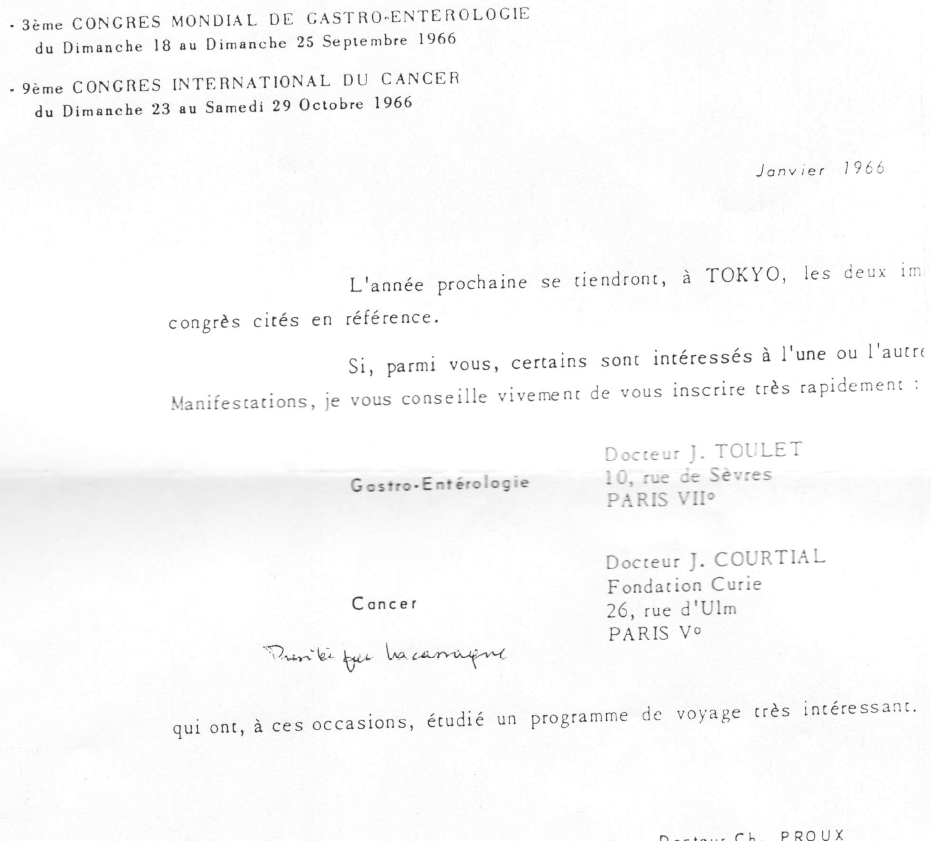
Courtial participated in the world congress about cancer at Tokyo in 1966

Jean Auguste Courtial (19 September 1903 – 26 December 1966) was a French physician, former polytechnician who worked at Curie Institute from 1950 to 1966.

Courtial was born in Paris. He established the fact that any animal without growth hormone can't have cancer.

André Gernez celebrated the memory of Jean Courtial to Société d'Encouragement au Progrès in 2009.
