= Courtial =

Courtial is a French surname. Notable people with the surname include:

- Édouard Courtial (born 1973), French politician
- Jean Courtial (1903–1966), French physician and polytechnician
- Jean-Pierre Courtial, French sociologist
