= Health insurance in India =

Health insurance in India is a growing segment of India's economy. The Indian healthcare system is one of the largest in the world, with the number of people it concerns: nearly 1.3 billion potential beneficiaries. The healthcare industry in India has rapidly become one of the most important sectors in the country in terms of income and job creation. In 2018, one hundred million Indian households (500 million people) benefit from health coverage. In 2011, 3.9% of India's gross domestic product was spent in the health sector.

Policies are available that offer both individual and family cover. Out of this 3.9%, health insurance accounts for 5-10% of expenditure, employers account for around 9% while personal expenditure amounts to an astounding 82%. In the year 2016, the NSSO released the report "Key Indicators of Social Consumption in India: Health" based on its 71st round of surveys. The survey carried out in the year 2014 found out that, more than 80% of Indians are not covered under any health insurance plan, and only 18% (government funded 12%) of the urban population and 14% (government funded 13%) of the rural population was covered under any form of health insurance.

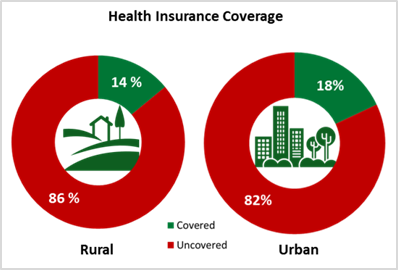
Health Insurance Coverage in India:Stats from NSSO survey

== Presentation ==
India's public health expenditures are lower than those of other middle-income countries. In 2012, they accounted for 4% of GDP, which is half as much as in China with 5.1%. In terms of public health spending per capita, India ranks 184th out of 191 countries in 2012. Patients' remaining costs represent about 58% of the total. The remaining costs borne by the patient represent an increasing share of the household budget, from 5% of this budget in 2000 to over 11% in 2004–2005. On average, the remaining costs of poor households as a result of hospitalization accounted for 140% of their annual income in rural areas and 90% in urban areas.

== History ==
Launched in 1986, the health insurance industry has grown significantly mainly due to liberalization of economy and general awareness. According to the World Bank, by 2010, more than 25% of India's population had access to some form of health insurance. There are standalone health insurers along with government sponsored health insurance providers. Until recently, to improve the awareness and reduce the procrastination for buying health insurance, the General Insurance Corporation of India and the Insurance Regulatory and Development Authority (IRDAI) had launched an awareness campaign for all segments of the population.

== Types of policies ==
The health insurance sector hovers around 10% in density calculations. India is a country with one of the lowest health insurance penetration, with only 18% of people in urban areas and 14% in rural areas covered under any kind of health insurance scheme. One of the main reasons for the low penetration and coverage of health insurance is the lack of competition in the sector. IRDAI which is responsible for insurance policies in India can create health circles, similar to telecom circles to promote competition.

- Policy price range: Insurance companies offer health insurance from a sum insured of ₹5,000 for micro-insurance policies to a higher sum insured of ₹5 million (US$52,000) and above. The common insurance policies for health insurance are usually available from ₹100,000 (US$1,000) to ₹500,000 (US$5,200).

== Tax benefits ==
Under Section 80D of the Income-tax Act the insured person who takes out the policy can claim for tax deductions.

The types of health insurance plans that are eligible for deduction under this section are individual health insurance policies, family floaters, top-up plans, super top-up plans, and hospital cash policies. Further, you can also get tax deductions for critical illness insurance, cancer insurance, health riders in term life, critical illness rider, hospital cash rider, and surgical care rider.

== Healthcare cost ==
According to Huffington Post, doctors spoke about the problems with "corporate hospitals" and senior surgeons being told to sell surgeries to their patients even if they weren't needed. In one instance, a doctor was told he would be sacked if he didn't have enough patients to operate on. The majority of India's private, for-profit hospitals charge exorbitant costs for medical services and supplies, which has put a strain on the country's public finances.

== See also ==
- Health insurance in the United States
- Health insurance coverage in the United States
- Health Insurance Portability and Accountability Act
- European Health Insurance Card
- Health insurance in China
- Health insurance mandate
- Universal health care
- Single-payer healthcare
- List of countries with universal health care
