= Maxence Layet =

French journalist and author

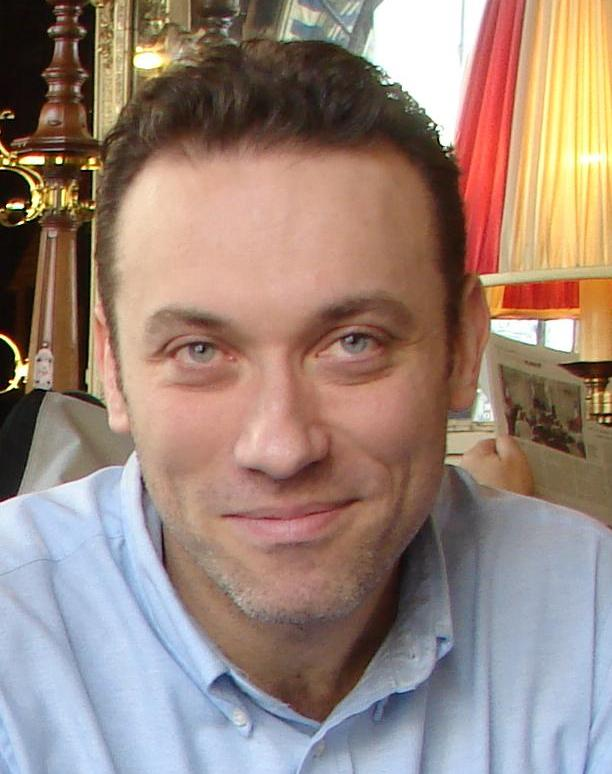
- Maxence Layet in April 2010 at Le Train Bleu
- Born: 1 April 1971 (age 55)
- Occupations: Journalist writer

Maxence Charles Layet (born 1 April 1971) is a French science and technology journalist and author.

== Biography ==
Maxence Layet attended the Aix-Marseille University where he studied sociology. From 1998 to 2001 he was an editor at a video-games website, gamelog.fr, then he contributed as free lancer at the French magazine Casus Belli. He was consultant at France Télécom. He has been investigating futurology about virtual worlds, cybernetics, greentech, electromagnetics warfare, bioelectromagnetism, environmental health and pollutions. In 2010, his book Electrocultures and free energies ((in French) Électrocultures et énergies libres), explores the electric and magnetic fields influences on plants.

== Bibliography ==
- (in French) 2006, The secret energy of Universe
- (in French) 2007, Futur 2.0
- (in French) 2008, Quinton, serum of life.
- (in French) 2009, Survive to mobile phone and wifi networks in the edition Le courrier du livre of Guy Trédaniel in March 2009.
- (in French) 2010, Électrocultures et énergies libres, Maxence Layet & Roland Wehrlen, Le courrier du Livre, ISBN 978-2-7029-0769-6, July 2010.

== Filmography ==
- Surrounded by the waves, Mosaïque Productions/Arte, 2009.
- (in French) Sous le feu des ondes, Mosaïque Productions/Arte, 2009.
