= MAPN =

MAPN may refer to:

- Ministry of National Defense (Romania)
- Medecins Aux Pieds Nus
