= Jean-Pierre Willem =

French doctor and humanitarian

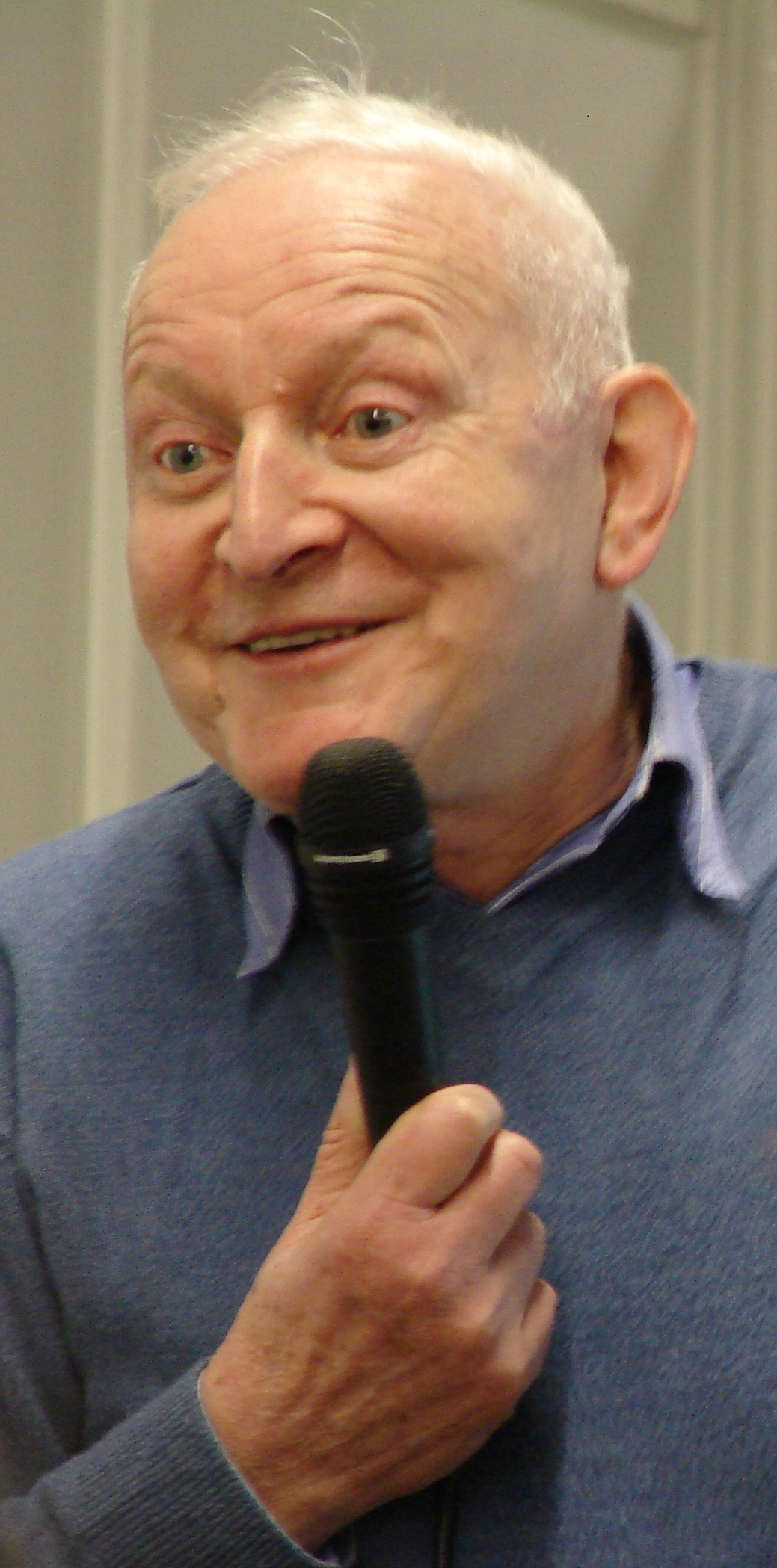
- Born: 24 May 1938 (age 88); Sedan, France
- Monuments: 4 December 2008 film in Paris
- Education: Doctor of medicine
- Movement: Médecins Aux Pieds Nus

Jean-Pierre Willem (born 24 May 1938 at Sedan, France) is a doctor and founder of Médecins Aux Pieds Nus. He led numerous humanitarian missions to help victims of catastrophes and conflicts. Willem also was a doctor of medicine and president of Organic Union International.

== Biography ==
In 1959, Jean-Pierre Willem co-organised the departure of 93 medical students to help local population during the Algerian War. In 1964, Dr Jean-Pierre Willem was commissioned six months with Doctor Albert Schweitzer in Lambaréné (Gabon) and then in Rwanda. In 1977, he worked with Bernard Kouchner for Médecins Sans Frontières and went to Laos during 7 months. In 1986, he created the Faculté Libre de Médecine Naturelle et d'Ethnomédecine (nicknamed FLMNE), a free faculty of natural medicine. In 1987, he founded a non-profit organisation called Médecins Aux Pieds Nus, translatable as Barefoot doctors.

Willem co-founded the phyto-hormones selling company Aromalia. He collaborated with André Gernez as President of Organic Union International in 2007.

== Hypothesis ==
- Nutrition and aromatherapy are preventive against degenerative disease.
- Médecins Aux Pieds Nus is a concept of proximity, prevention and humility: being balanced, motivated and empathic are qualities required to be a humanitarian doctor

== Experiments ==
Experiments on rats or rabbits shows :

- 93% of cancer decrease with Acidosis protocol, fasting and nutriments.
- 50% of cancer decrease with an annual fasting: one month of abstaining from the third of the food ration when the spring begins.

== Bibliography ==
Here is a non-exhaustive list of the books published by Doctor Jean-Pierre Willem:

- (in French) Prévenir et vaincre le Cancer, Guy Trédaniel, 2004, ISBN 2-84445-559-X
- (in French) Le Secret des Peuples Sans Cancer, Le Dauphin, réédition 2005, ISBN 2-7163-1288-5
- (in French) Les Secrets du Régime Crétois, Le Dauphin 1999, ISBN 2-7163-1155-2
- (in French) Les Huiles Essentielles, médecine d'avenir, Le Dauphin 2002, ISBN 2-7163-1206-0
- (in French) Les Antibiotiques Naturels, Sully 2003, ISBN 2-911074-50-5
- (in French) Au Diable Arthrose et Arthrite, Robert Jauze 2003, ISBN 2-86214-045-7
- (in French) Aroma-minceur, Éditions Albin Michel - 2004, ISBN 2-226-15339-X
- (in French) Aroma-stress, Éditions Albin Michel – 2005, ISBN 2-226-15733-6
- (in French) Aroma-famille, Éditions Albin Michel – 2005, ISBN 2-226-16867-2
- (in French) Aroma-allergies, Éditions Albin Michel – 2005, ISBN 2-226-16894-X
- (in French) Ensemble, sauvons notre planète (ouvrage collectif) Guy Trédaniel 2005, ISBN 2-84445-610-3
- (in French) L’Ethnomédecine, une alliance entre science et tradition, Jouvence & Biocontact - 2006, ISBN 2-88353-472-1
- (in French) 100 maladies du XXIè siècle Solutions Naturelles, éditions Testez – 2008, ISBN 2-87461-048-8
- (in French) Mémoires d'un médecin aux pieds nus, édition Éditions Albin Michel - 2009, ISBN 978-2-226-18987-5.

== See also ==
- Albert Schweitzer
- Alain Deloche
- Bernard Kouchner
