= André Gernez =

French oncologist (1923–2014)

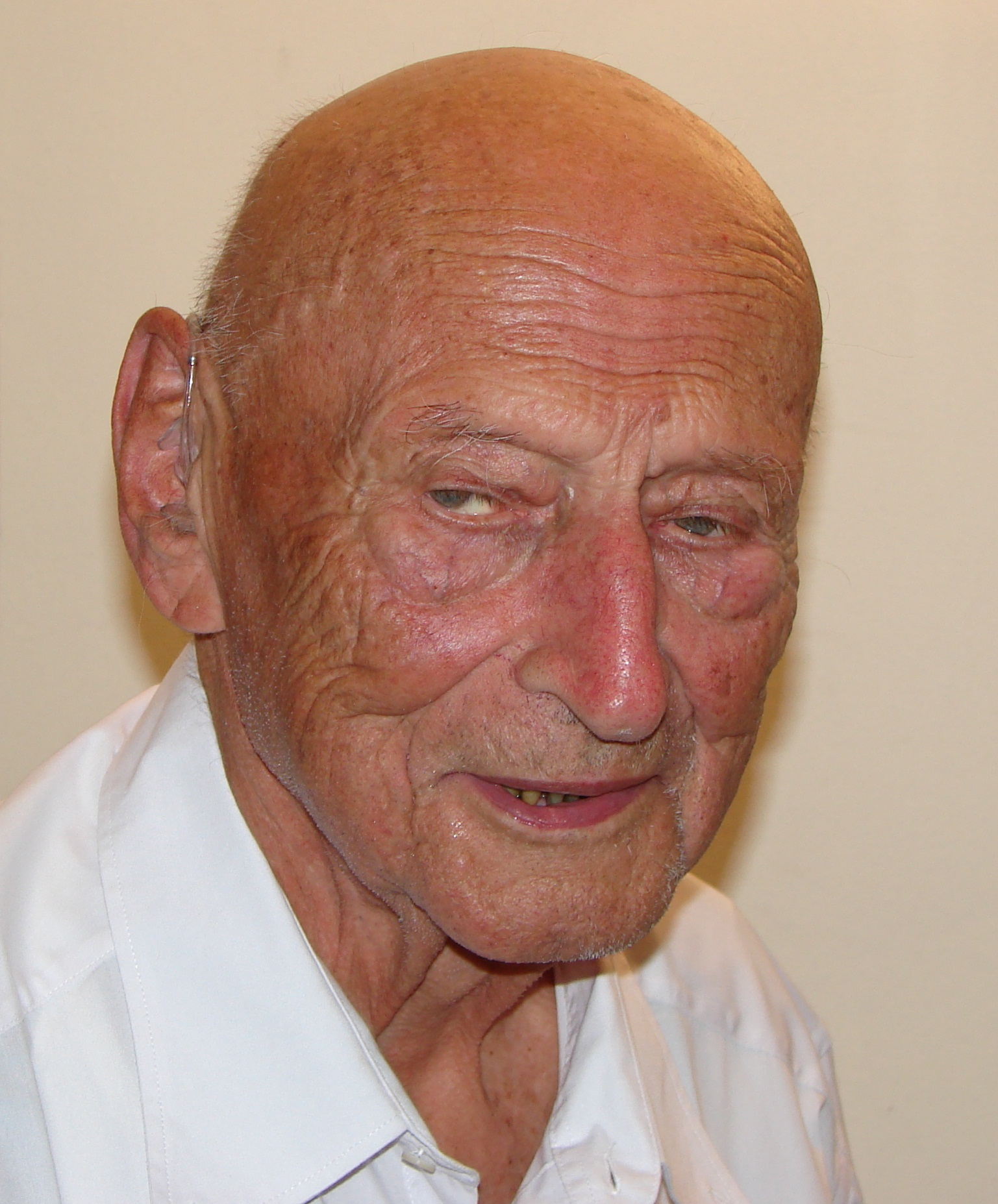
- André Gernez in 2010 at Palm Beach
- Born: 25 January 1923; Avesnes-les-Aubert, France
- Died: 8 January 2014 (aged 90); Roubaix, France
- Known for: Cancer research
- Awards: Hans Adalbert Schweigart from World Union for Protection of Life in 1979; Gold medal of Société d'Encouragement au Progrès in 2007
- Scientific career
- Workplaces: Organic Union International

André Gernez (25 January 1923 – 8 January 2014) was a French physician, oncologist, and radiologist. His work has received criticism from other medical professionals as being unscientific, or alternative medicine.

Gernez explained diseases, including cancer and neurodegenerative conditions, through a theory of mitosis and differentiation. He posited that only limited populations of cells within tissue are able to divide, comparing tissue to a colony of bees in which only the queen is able to reproduce.

== Biography ==
André Gernez was born in January 1923 in Avesnes-les-Aubert.

Gernez enlisted in the military during World War II at the age of 14 under special exemption, and was certified as a military doctor in 1944. At the time, he was the youngest doctor in France at the age of 21.

Gernez established a radiology-radiotherapy practice, which he ran from 1968 to 1976.

In 1989 Gernez co-founded an association, Organic Union International (OUI), in favor of self-medication with doctors Jacques Lacaze and Jean-Pierre Willem.

He died aged 90 in 2014.

== Beliefs and Criticism ==
In 1970, Gernez contested the belief first established by Santiago Ramón y Cajal that neurogenesis ceases after birth, postulating that neurogenesis can continue after birth. Gernez's theory is not held to be true by the general scientific community, as supporting evidence only suggests that mitosis of neural cells does not continue after birth.

In 1980, Gernez proposed a "biological need to believe," suggesting that religious belief is genetically fixed in the limbic system. Although others have proposed similar theories, there is no empirical evidence suggesting that religion has a biological basis.

Oncologist Olivier Jallut describes Gernez's preventative treatments as dangerous and unacceptable, and his curative methods as lacking in scientific legitimacy. Jallut cites earlier writings by Vigeral on the topic, who similarly described Gernez's work as having no scientific basis, with inadequate evaluation methods, and his practices as ineffective and potentially dangerous.

== Awards ==
- 1979: Hans Adalbert Schweigart medal from World Union for Protection of Life on 17 June in Salzburg, Austria with Konrad Lorenz.
- 2007: 19 November, gold medal of Societé d'Encouragement au Progrès (SEP) in Senate at Paris, France.

== Bibliography and films ==
- Prévention de la dégénérescence cancéreuse et artérielle, André Gernez, (available in 2009).
- Le scandale du siècle, tome 1 & 2, DVD André Gernez with the collaboration of Jean-Pierre Willem, produced by Jean-Yves Bilien, 2007.
- Les grands médicaments, Henri Pradal et André Gernez, éd. Edition du Seuil, Paris (France), 1975.
- Néo-postulats biologiques et pathogéniques, André Gernez, éd. La vie Claire, Mandres-les-roses (France), 1975, first published October 1968, 122 pages.
- Loi et règles de la cancérisation, André Gernez, éd. Verschave, Roubaix (France), 1970, 168 pages.
- Le cancer, dynamique et éradication, André Gernez, December 1969, 162 pages.
- La carcinogénèse, mécanisme et prévention (essai sur la dynamique des populations cellulaires), André Gernez, March 1969, 182 pages.

== See also ==
- Alain Deloche
- Elizabeth Gould
