= Health insurance in China =

Overview article

Health insurance in the People's Republic of China is largely run by local governments. China has near universal health insurance coverage. Health insurance remains underdeveloped and out-of-pocket payments are a significant portion of healthcare costs. Previously separate, health insurance for both urban and rural residents have been merged into a single system (Health Insurance for Urban and Rural Residents) since 2016.

== Overview ==
Health insurance in the People's Republic of China is primarily run by local governments.

As of 2022, healthcare insurance is relatively underdeveloped in China. Out-of-pocket payments are a significant proportion of total healthcare costs.

Since 2017, sickness and maternity cash benefits have been included as part of basic medical insurance.

== Health Insurance for Urban and Rural Residents (2016-present) ==
In 2016, the government merged Health Insurance for Urban Residents and the New Rural Cooperative Medical System into a single system, Health Insurance for Urban and Rural Residents (HIURR). Under this system, the contribution rate, reimbursement rates, and government subsidies are the same for both urban and rural residents.

As of at least 2022, China's health insurance coverage is near universal.

In 2012, China implemented catastrophic disease insurance for urban and rural residents. This insurance covers healthcare expenditures which exceed the maximum amount of reimbursement otherwise permitted under HIURR. Residents do not contribute any additional fees for catastrophic disease insurance, which is funded through HIURR premiums. Commercial insurers operate the catastrophic disease insurance and compete with each other to be awarded the right to do so in a particular region.

== History of rural systems ==
=== Rural Cooperative Medical System ===
People's communes replaced township governments in 1958. Initially, healthcare stations were established as fee-for-service hospitals to cover several large production brigades (small villages were called production brigades, and several small production brigades together became large production brigades).

During the Cultural Revolution (1966-1976), Mao Zedong emphasized the need to improve medical care in rural China. The Rural Cooperative Medical System (RCMS) developed in the late 1960s. In this system, each large production brigade established a medical cooperative station staffed by barefoot doctors. The medical cooperative stations provided primary health care. For treatment of major diseases, rural people traveled to state-owned hospitals.

=== New Rural Co-operative Medical Scheme (2002–2016) ===
The system of people's communes ended in the early 1980s. Farmers began to work independently on land allocated to them by their villages and production brigades were replaced by village unions. Village unions did not have the financial capacity or ability to mobilize other resources the way that production brigades had. Among the results of this, the RCMS dissolved and healthcare stations were privatized.

As RCMS ended, 900 million rural people became uninsured. The New Rural Co-operative Medical Care Scheme (NRCMS) was established to overhaul the healthcare system, particularly intended to make it more affordable for the rural poor. The NRCMS was initially outlined in Decisions on the strengthening of the rural health system issued in 2002 by CCP Central Committee, the highest decision-making authority in China. Pilots started in 2003, followed by fast expansion. By 2008, more than 90% of total population was enrolled in NRCMS.

NRCMS a voluntary insurance scheme subsidized by local and central government. NRCMS differs from RCMS in the following perspectives: Administration and risk-pooling is set at county level, much higher than NRCMS's village level. Funds of NRCMS are provided by local and central government (for poorer regions) together, which contrasts with the old RCMS that was almost completely funded by the Chinese government and extended universally across all parts of China. NRCMS covers expense in all level public healthcare facilities, though the rate varies by regions and by type of facilities, while RCMS provided access to the barefoot doctors only.

The World Health Organization (WHO) summarized the success of NRCMS: the NRCMS rapidly expanded, with an increasing service bundle. It provided better access to higher quality service, and partly controlled medical costs. NRCMS is appropriate and convenient for China's enormous number of migrant workers who used to have limited access to healthcare. In 2015, NRCMS spent CN¥293.34 billion (US$45 billion) on 670 million participants and 1.653 billion instances of medical service, with the average of CN¥437.8 (US$67.25) per capita.

However, there are some difficulties that undermine the scheme's effectiveness in reducing out-of-pocket medical costs. To begin with, the benefit package of NRCMS is mostly limited to catastrophic and inpatient care. While these costs are covered, most outpatient visits requires substantial individual payment. Secondly, the reimbursement rate varies across level of healthcare facilities, increasing the cost of high-level hospital visit. The details of the NRCMS show that patients benefit most from the NRCMS at a local level. If patients go to a small hospital or clinic in their local town, the scheme will cover from 70–80% of their bill, but if they go to a county one, the percentage of the cost being covered falls to about 60%, and if they need specialist help in a large modern city hospital, they have to bear most of the cost themselves, as the scheme would cover only about 30% of the bill. Furthermore, a fee-for service structure in the healthcare system provides incentives for healthcare providers to prescribe medicine or perform treatment in excess than is necessary to treat the patient. In addition, NRCMS reduces the actual cost of a medical service, but patients prefer to purchase more medical services in response to the reduced cost, offsetting the benefits of NRCMS. Those who are poor or in poorer regions benefit less from NRCMS.

== History of urban systems ==
=== Labor Health Insurance and Government Health Insurance ===
In the early 1950s, China established Labor Health Insurance (LHI) to cover state-owned enterprise employees and employees of some urban collectively-owned enterprises. Various labor departments managed LHI and its funding came from the enterprises.

In the early 1950s, China established Government Health Insurance (GHI) for employees of government administrative units (like government agencies) and employees of operative units (like public schools, universities, and hospitals). GHI was funded through taxes.

=== Urban Employee Basic Medical Insurance (1999–present) ===
After the reform and opening up, the cost of healthcare in China rose rapidly. Many urban employees lost their healthcare insurance due to reforms in state-owned-enterprises. As a result, urban areas saw a rising need for access to affordable healthcare.

Beginning in 1995, the government began healthcare reforms and encouraged local experiments. In 1996, the government stated that it would establish a new healthcare system in which each city would provide health insurance to urban workers. In 1997, the CCP Central Committee and China State Council issued universal healthcare reform guidelines, an important part of which is to establish medical scheme in urban areas. Urban Employee Basic Medical Insurance and Urban Residents Basic Medical Insurance was created to cover healthcare expense for urban working residents and non-working residents respectively.

In 1998, Urban Employee Basic Medical Insurance (UEBMI) was introduced to provide healthcare access to urban working and retired employees in public and private sectors as well. The UEBMI is administered at municipal level, higher than NRCMS. The UEBMI is funded by 8% deductions from employees' wages; of which 6% are paid by employers and 2% by employees, however these rates can vary by municipality. It differs from other types of insurance schemes in that UEBMI is mandatory. In 2014, roughly 283 million were enrolled, contributing CN¥80.3 billion, CN¥283.74 per capita (US$12.97 billion in total, US$45.83 per capita), with an expenditure of CN¥66.9 billion, CN¥236.4 per capita (US$10.8 billion in total, US$38.19 per capita).

=== Urban Residents Basic Medical Insurance (2007–2016) ===
In 2007, Urban Residents Basic Medical Insurance (URBMI) started to provide healthcare access to urban residents that are not covered by UEBMI: children, students in schools, colleges and universities and other non-working urban residents. It became nationwide in 2010. In 2015, 376 million urban residents (over 95%) took part in URBMI.

URBMI is a government-subsidized, household-level voluntary medical insurance, administered at municipal level. The URBMI is funded mainly on individual contributions (CN¥245 for adults; 2008 pilot), and partly government contributions (at least CN¥80 per capita). Additional government contributions are given to undeveloped central and western regions, and poor or disabled individuals. Research showed that URBMI helped improve healthcare utilization and residents' health conditions, especially for low-income residents. Studies also suggested that URBMI was a step towards a universal healthcare system.
