= Healthcare in China =

Healthcare in the People's Republic of China is primarily provided by state-owned hospitals, with medical insurance administered primarily by local governments. As of 2020, about 95% of the population has at least basic health insurance coverage.

Medical insurances are subdivided into employee and resident insurance. The former covers the urban employed population, and the latter covers the urban non-employed population and the rural population. A total of 25% of the people covered by the basic medical insurance participated in the employee medical insurance, a total of 344 million people; 75% participated in the residents' medical insurance, a total of 1.017 billion people. Medical assistance has subsidized 78 million poor people to participate in basic medical insurance, and the coverage of poor people has stabilized at over 99.9%.

Despite this, public health insurance generally only covers about half of medical costs, with the proportion lower for serious or chronic illnesses. Under the "Healthy China 2020" initiative, China undertook an effort to cut healthcare costs, requiring insurance to cover 70% of costs by the end of 2018. In addition, there are policies such as critical illness insurance and medical assistance. China's commercial health insurance is also proliferating. In 2020, the country's commercial health insurance premium income amounted to 817.3 billion yuan, with an average annual growth rate of 20%. China's coverage of maternity insurance has continued to expand, by the end of 2020, 235.673 million people were insured under maternity insurance.

The country maintains two parallel medical systems, one for modern or Western medicine, and one for Traditional Chinese medicine (TCM). Some Chinese consider TCM backward and ineffective, others consider it inexpensive, effective, and culturally appropriate. China has also become a major market for health-related multinational companies. Companies such as AstraZeneca, GlaxoSmithKline, Eli Lilly, and Merck entered the Chinese market and have experienced explosive growth. China has also become a growing hub for healthcare research and development. According to Sam Radwan of ENHANCE International, China's projected healthcare spending in 2050 may exceed Germany's entire 2020 gross domestic product.

The special administrative regions of Hong Kong and Macau maintain their own separate universal healthcare systems.

== History ==
Traditional and folk medicine served as the basis for health care in China. Western-inspired evidence-based medicine made its way to China beginning in the nineteenth century. During the Republic of China era, western-style medicine was mostly not present in the Chinese countryside, although there was some western-style medicine available via missionary-run institutions.

Free medical treatment was practiced in areas controlled by the Chinese Communist Party (CCP) before 1949. The CCP-controlled areas lacked access to Western-style medical resources. To improve health care, the CCP promoted the integration of traditional Chinese medicine with Western medical science. In the Yan'an Soviet, mass campaigns sought to "scientize Chinese medicine" and "make Western medicine Chinese." As part of the mobilization effort, the CCP had state doctors lead the "scientizing" process and gave high political status and public honors to some local practitioners of traditional Chinese medicine.

=== Mao-era PRC ===
After Mao Zedong's 1949 proclamation of the People's Republic of China, national "patriotic health campaigns" and local governments successfully introduced basic sanitary measures and preventative hygiene education. Health care was provided through the place of work, such as the government bureaucratic unit, the enterprise, factory, school, or, in the countryside, the cooperative or commune. Larger danwei might have their own in-patient clinic on premises.

Western-style medicine first made significant inroads in rural China via the PRC efforts to increase immunization by vaccinating people against smallpox, tuberculosis, and typhoid fever.

The government nationalized all missionary-owned and other private hospitals, turning them into state-owned hospitals.

In February 1951, the industrial and mining departments began to try out labor insurance regulations and solve workers' medical problems. In the same year, free medical treatment was also tried in northern Shaanxi and some ethnic minority areas. On June 27, 1952, the Instructions of the Administration Council on the Practice of Free Medical Treatment and Prevention for State Functionaries of People's Governments at all levels, parties, organizations and affiliated Institutions were issued. After that, the CCP government gradually communized the medical and health system and modernized it in imitation of the Soviet Union. During the period of planned economy, a tertiary hospital structure was established: a tertiary medical service and epidemic prevention system consisting of municipal and district hospitals and outpatients from sub-districts, factories, and mines. A three-level medical prevention and health care network is established in rural areas, with county hospitals as the leader, township (town) health centers as the hub, and village clinics as the basis.

During the Great Leap Forward, the PRC encouraged increased focus on local health care. It established hospitals at the commune level, and were financed by a collective welfare fund paid for via work points by the brigades. Medical treatment at these hospitals was free to the individual although medicine still had to be paid for. This increased health care access although it was still beyond the means of many rural people. Dissatisfaction with a health care model that provided more support to urban than rural people increased interest in traditional Chinese medicine, and this interest was also increased by pride in China's intellectual and cultural heritage. In 1958, Mao further encouraged application of traditional Chinese medicine by describing it as a "treasure house" of remedies that must be explored.

The famine greatly disrupted the decentralized mode of health care.

Before the Cultural Revolution, the Ministry of Health focused on the delivery of health care in urban hospitals. Mao criticized Minister of Health Qian Xinzhong for promoting this health care model, arguing that an urban hospital-focused health care model failed to treat peasants and focused on cure rather than preventative medicine. Mao also described the Ministry itself as the Ministry "of urban overlords." Contentions within the CCP on the health care disparity between urban and rural areas became a significant focus of the intra-party "struggle between two lines in the mid-1960s.

=== Cultural Revolution ===
The Cultural Revolution brought a greater focus on rural health care. In his June 26 Directive, Mao prioritized healthcare and medicine for rural people throughout the country. As a result, clinics and hospitals sent their staff on medical tours of rural areas and rural cooperative healthcare expanded. Barefoot doctors brought healthcare to rural areas. They promoted basic hygiene, preventive healthcare, and family planning and treated common illnesses. Immunizations were provided free of charge. Public healthcare was highly effective in curbing infectious diseases in rural China.

Beginning in 1968, a medical cooperative system was established in rural China. In this system, village unions established medical cooperative stations which were financed by village administrations and villagers themselves. These were staffed by barefoot doctors. For serious illnesses, rural people traveled to hospitals owned by local governments. Rural patients paid expenses at state-owned hospitals themselves.

=== Deng's economic reform ===
However, beginning with reform and opening up in 1978, health standards in China began to diverge significantly between urban and rural areas and coastal and interior provinces. The barefoot doctor system was put in free fall in 1981, as the "commune" system was shut down. By 1984, only 4.8% of villages had cooperative healthcare coverage, a sharp drop from the 90% coverage of the mid-1970s. The barefoot doctor model officially ended during the Chinese Medical Reformation of 1985, when the term 'barefoot doctor' was removed from the healthcare system and replaced with the term and concept of 'village doctors'. Though most village doctors are former barefoot doctors, they started charging for their services as private entities.

Urban residents also faced healthcare privatization as they were laid off from state-owned enterprises and lost much of their social security and health benefits. As a result, the majority of urban residents paid almost all health costs out-of-pocket beginning in the 1990s, and most rural residents simply could not afford to pay for healthcare in urban hospitals.

In 1989, the Chinese government decided to try and reverse the fall of rural healthcare coverage, but they were not very successful: coverage was only up to 10% by 1993. In 1994, the government decided to fund a revival of the co-operative system, though they would not be successful until the 2005 NRCMCS project.

Despite the consequences of privatization, the economic reforms did bring in money and new technology for building new hospital infrastructure. Modern hospital infrastructure expanded significantly in China beginning in the 1990s.

=== 21st century ===
The 2003 SARS epidemic resulted in substantial public criticism, prompted government statements that privatizing health care in rural China had been a failure, and brought rural reform to the top of the policy agenda. The government launched the New Rural Co-operative Medical Care System (NRCMCS) in 2005 in an overhaul of the healthcare system, particularly intended to make it more affordable for the rural poor. Under the NRCMCS, some 800 million rural residents gained basic, tiered medical coverage, with the central and provincial governments covering between 30 and 80% of regular medical expenses.

Since 2009, China has been undertaking the most significant healthcare reforms since the Mao era. The availability of medical insurance has increased in urban areas as well. By 2011 more than 95% of the total population of China had basic health insurance, though out-of-pocket costs and the quality of care varied significantly, particularly when it came to serious illnesses among children. CCP leadership cadres have access to a dedicated healthcare system under the jurisdiction of the General Office of the Chinese Communist Party.

== Current healthcare system ==
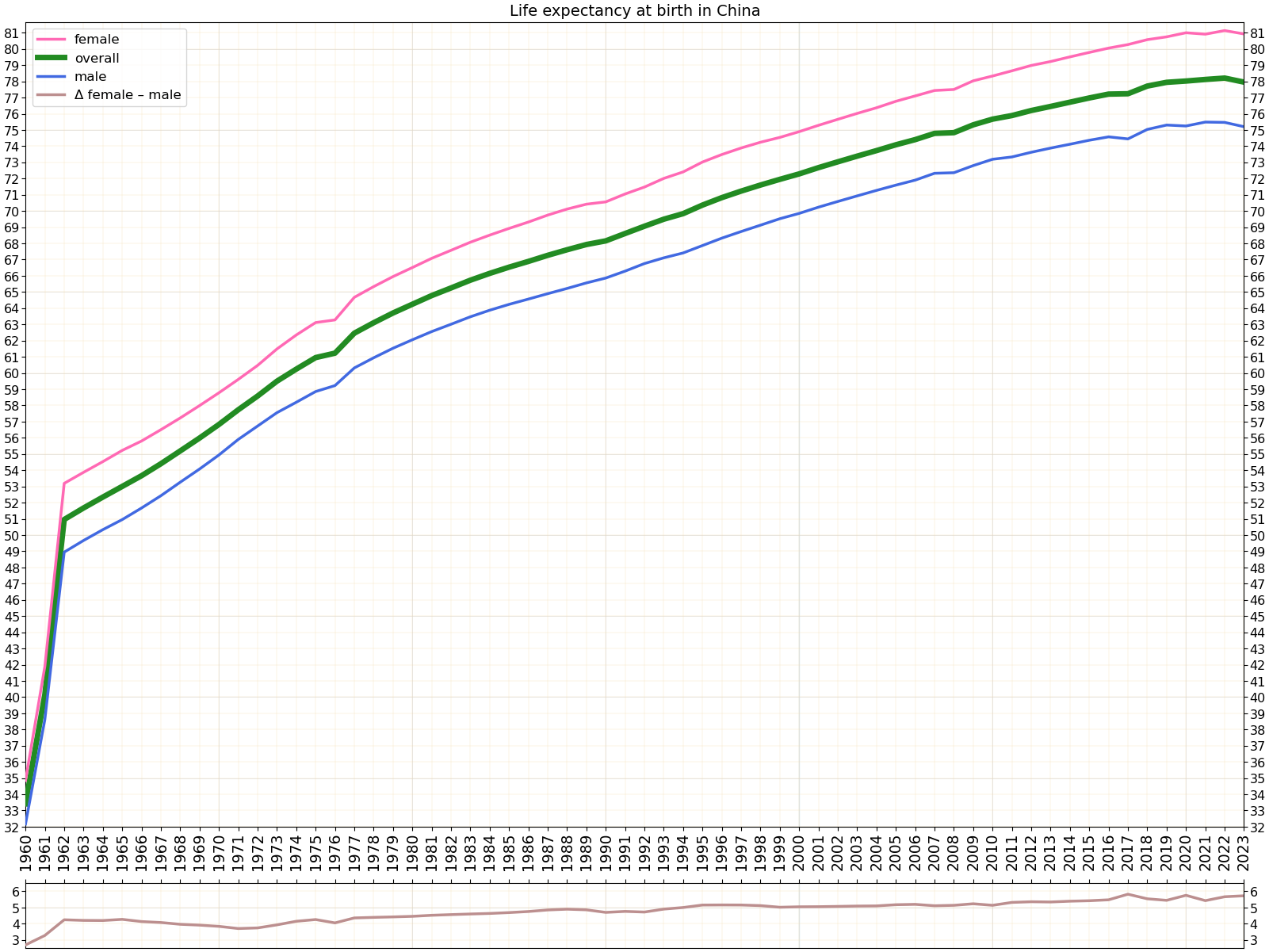
Life expectancy in China

Healthcare services in China are primarily provided by state-owned hospitals. State-owned hospitals provide services for approximately 90% of patients in China. Patients generally receive their outpatient care, including vaccination, at hospitals.

State-owned hospitals are larger than private hospitals and have better physicians and medical equipment. The government regulates the price of services and wages for state-owned hospital personnel.

Health insurance is primarily operated by local governments.

The Chinese healthcare system maintains traditional Chinese medicine (TCM) and modern medicine as two parallel medical systems. The government invests in TCM research and administration, but TCM is challenged by having too few professionals with knowledge and skills and rising public awareness of modern or western models.

Major cities have hospitals specializing in different fields and are equipped with some modern facilities. Public hospitals and clinics are available in cities. Their quality varies by location; the best treatment can usually be found in public city-level hospitals, followed by smaller district-level clinics. Many public hospitals in major cities have so-called V.I.P. wards or gāogàn bìngfáng (Chinese: 高干病房). These feature reasonably up-to-date medical technology and skilled staff. Most V.I.P. wards also provide medical services to foreigners and have English-speaking doctors and nurses. V.I.P. wards typically charge higher prices than other hospital facilities, but are still often cheap by Western standards.

In addition to modern care, traditional Chinese medicine is also widely used, and there are Chinese medicine hospitals and treatment facilities located throughout the country. Dental care, cosmetic surgery, and other health-related services at Western standards are widely available in urban areas, though costs vary. Historically, in rural areas, most healthcare was available in clinics providing rudimentary care, with poorly trained medical personnel and little medical equipment or medications, though certain rural areas had far higher-quality medical care than others. However, the quality of rural health services has improved dramatically since 2009. In an increasing trend, healthcare for residents of rural areas unable to travel long distances to reach an urban hospital is provided by family doctors who travel to the homes of patients, which is covered by the government.

Reform of the health care system in urban areas of China has prompted concerns about the demand and use of Community Health Services Centers; a 2012 study, however, found that insured patients are less likely to use private clinics and more likely to use the centers.

A cross-sectional study between 2003 and 2011 showed remarkable increases in health insurance coverage and inpatient reimbursement accompanied by increased use and coverage. The increases in service use are particularly important in rural areas and at hospitals. Major advances have been made in achieving equal access to insurance coverage, inpatient reimbursement, and basic health services, most notably for hospital delivery, and use of outpatient and inpatient care.

A 2016 report from the World Bank Group, the World Health Organization, the Ministry of Finance, the National Health and Family Planning Commission, and the Ministry of Human Resources and Social Security of China recommended health care reforms to reduce healthcare spending in China by shifting away from a hospital-centric model towards a system that focuses more on primary care, health service equality, and cost-efficient health services. The report found that the greatest health threat to the Chinese population is from non-communicable diseases which replaced infectious diseases as most common threat. The threat from non-communicable disease is worsened by behaviors like sedentary lifestyles, high alcohol consumption, and smoking as well as air pollution. The report suggests that without health care reforms the spending on health care in China will increase to 9% of China's GDP by 2035 which is an increase from the 5.6% of China's GDP in 2014.

With substantial urbanization, attention to health care has changed. Urbanization offers opportunities for improvements in population health in China (such as access to improved health care and basic infrastructure) and substantial health risks including air pollution, occupational and traffic hazards, and the risks conferred by changing diets and activity. Communicable infections should also be re-focused on. In 2022, the BBC's chief international correspondent Lyse Doucet said China had a very good healthcare system including at the provincial level.

As of 2022, enrollment in China's nationwide healthcare system is almost universal. However, these plans generally provide low levels of benefits. In 2022, there were 1.34 billion people enrolled in state-subsidized basic health insurance, which was 17 million fewer people compared to 2021. The drop may be attributable to steadily rising premiums, reduced benefits as well as rising co-payments and other changing policies.

The National Healthcare Security Administration published in 2024 a statistical report on the development of the country's medical insurance industry, which reported that China had 198,000 medical institutions and 352,400 pharmacies 550,000 medical and medicine institutions in the national medical insurance network. The statistical report also noted that in 2023 centralized bulk drug procurement reduced medical expenses for 80 drugs and an average price cut of 57%.

== Resources ==
In 2005 China had about 1,938,000 physicians (1.5 per 1,000 persons) and about 3,074,000 hospital beds (2.4 per 1,000 persons). Health expenditures on a purchasing power parity (PPP) basis were US$224 per capita in 2001 or 5.5 percent of the gross domestic product. Some 37.2 percent of public expenditures were devoted to health care in China in 2001. However, about 80 percent of the health and medical care services are concentrated in cities, and timely medical care is not available to more than 100 million people in rural areas. To offset this imbalance, in 2005 China set out a five-year plan to invest 20 billion renminbi (RMB; US$2.4 billion) to rebuild the rural medical service system composed of village clinics and township- and county-level hospitals. By 2018 this goal had been completed and the country had a total of 309,000 general practitioners or 2.22 per 10,000 people.

There is a shortage of doctors and nurses in China. More doctors are being trained, but most aim to leave the countryside in favor of the cities, leaving significant shortages in rural areas.

In 2016 it was reported that ticket resale was widely practiced at Beijing Tongren Hospital and Peking University First Hospital. Advance tickets for outpatient consultation are sold by the hospitals for 200 yuan but sold for as much as 3,000 yuan. An eye doctor commented that the appointment fees did not reflect the economic value of doctors' skills and experience and that the scalpers were selling the doctor's appointment at a price the market is prepared to pay.

== Medical training ==
In 1956, in the midst of China's education reform modeling Soviet practices, the Ministry of Hygiene embarked on standardizing medical education and organizing medical colleges in China. Taking an April, 1955 Soviet curriculum as reference, the resulting curriculum would offer a tertiary higher medical education at a maximum of 12 years. By 1958, traditional Chinese medicine was included in the curriculum. Beginning in 1962, a six-year course for medical education and a five-year course in pharmacology came into effect. Despite these early standardizations, the Cultural Revolution saw a halt in higher medical education and a preference for "barefoot doctors" with little to none formal medical education. Higher medical education was revived in 1977 on orders of the Ministry of Education and the State Department to resume higher education; starting February, 1978, students are enrolled in a five-year course for medical school and a four-year course for pharmacology at the undergraduate level.

In 2012, the Chinese Ministry of Education proposed again to standardize medical education in China into "5+3" programs: five years of undergraduate medical school training and three years of residency. Meanwhile, the same proposal also suggested a "3+2" program for graduates of higher vocational colleges: a three-year vocational medical degree and two years residency. The indetermination of this departmental opinion displayed how various tracks of higher medical education coexist in contemporary China. Previously, a 1998 State Department regulation established professional clinical medicine degrees of Master of Medicine (M.M) and Doctor of Medicine (M.D). Applicants to these degrees require three years of experience as resident physicians as well as supervised training of at least six months; a M.M holder may advance to M.D with three years of further residency, bring the potential length of the most advanced medical degree in China to 11 years. Neither of these regulations, though theoretically still in effect, reflect the full reality of undergraduate and postgraduate degree programs in the early decades of the 21st century. By 2019, Chinese medical education features tracks of three-year (vocational or no degree), five-year (Bachelor of Medicine), "5+3" (Master's degree in Medicine or in Clinical Medicine), eight-year (MD), etc. Postgraduate degrees are further categorized into research degrees and professional degrees.

The National Health Commission of the People's Republic of China certifies practitioner qualification through annual qualification examinations managed by its subsidiary National Medical Examination Center (NMEC). The 2021 Law on Doctors of the People's Republic of China (《中华人民共和国医师法》) rules that physicians satisfying the following criteria may enter qualification exams, catering to three types of practitioners, those with a bachelor's degree or above, with a junior-college or vocational degree, and those engaged in Traditional Chinese and ethnic Medicine practices:

has obtained a bachelor's degree or above in a medicine-related major from an institution of higher education and has completed at least one year of medical work practice at a medical and healthcare institution under the guidance of a practicing doctor.(Article 9, subsection 1)

has obtained a junior college degree in a medicine-related major from an institution of higher education, and has practiced with a medical and healthcare institution for at least two years after obtaining a practicing certificate of practicing assistant doctors.(Article 9, subsection 2)

has obtained a junior college degree or above in a medicine-related major from an institution of higher education and has completed at least one year of medical work practice at a medical and healthcare institution under the guidance of a practicing doctor may take the examination of practicing assistant doctors' qualifications. (Article 10)

Notably, Article 11 specifies how Traditional Chinese Medicine practitioners may obtain qualification: "has studied TCM for at least three years through master-disciple education or who has acquired special medical skill after many years of practice may, after passing the assessment of and being recommended by a professional TCM organization or a medical and healthcare institution authorized by the health department of the people's government at or above the county level, take the examination of TCM doctors' qualifications."

=== Nursing training ===
Nursing education in China is offered at three levels: secondary vocational (3-year program), college diploma (3-year associate degree), and university degree (4-year BSN or master's degree). As of 2022, China had approximately 5.2 million registered nurses (RN), with the BSN pathway growing as the standard for hospital-based nursing practice in tertiary medical centers.

== Traditional and modern Chinese medicine ==
China has one of the longest recorded histories of medicine records of any existing civilization. The methods and theories of traditional Chinese medicine have developed for over two thousand years. Western medical theory and practice came to China in the nineteenth and twentieth centuries, notably through the efforts of missionaries and the Rockefeller Foundation, which together founded Peking Union Medical College. Today Chinese traditional medicine continues alongside western medicine and traditional physicians, who also receive some western medical training, are sometimes primary caregivers in the clinics and pharmacies of rural China. Various traditional preventative and self-healing techniques such as qigong, which combines gentle exercise and meditation, are widely practiced as an adjunct to professional health care.

Although the practice of traditional Chinese medicine was strongly promoted by the Chinese leadership and remained a major component of health care, Western medicine gained increasing acceptance in the 1970s and 1980s. For example, the number of physicians and pharmacists trained in Western medicine reportedly increased by 225,000 from 1976 to 1981, and the number of physician assistants trained in Internal Medicine increased by about 50,000. In 1981 there were reportedly 516,000 senior physicians trained in Western medicine and 290,000 senior physicians trained in traditional Chinese medicine. The goal of China's medical professionals is to synthesize the best elements of traditional and Western approaches.

In practice, however, this combination has not always worked smoothly. In many respects, physicians trained in traditional medicine and those trained in Western medicine constitute separate groups with different interests. For instance, physicians trained in Western medicine have been somewhat reluctant to accept unscientific traditional practices, and traditional practitioners have sought to preserve authority in their own re. Although Chinese medical schools that provided training in Western medicine also provided some instruction in traditional medicine, relatively few physicians were regarded as competent in both areas in the mid-1980s.

The extent to which traditional and Western treatment methods were combined and integrated into the monitor hospitals variety they monitor hospitals and medical schools of purely traditional medicine was established. In most urban hospitals, the pattern seemed to be to establish separate departments for traditional and Western treatment. In the county hospitals, however, traditional medicine received greater emphasis.

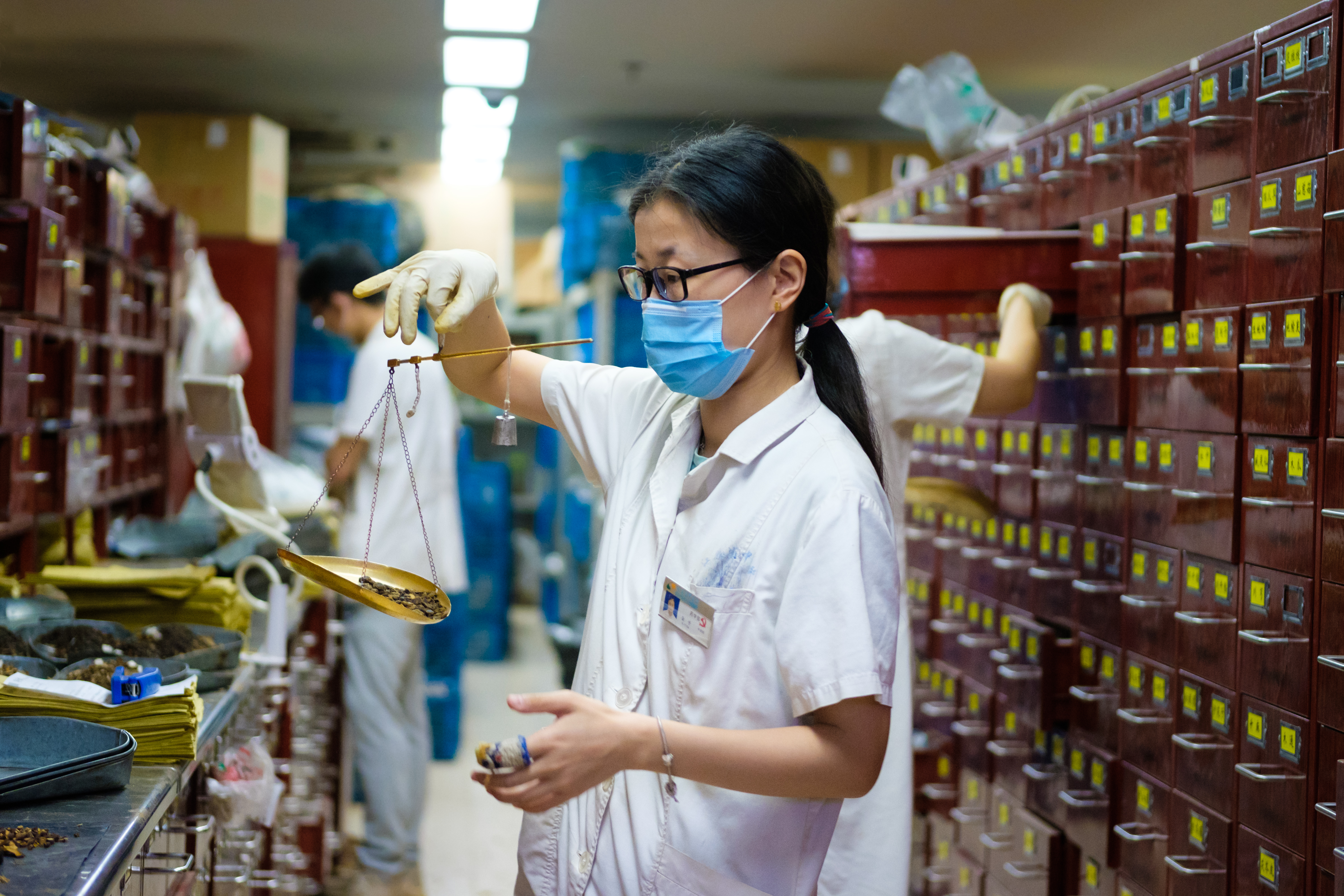
Apothecary mixing traditional Chinese medicine

Traditional medicine depends on herbal treatments, acupuncture, acupressure, moxibustion (burning of herbs over acupuncture points), "cupping" (local suction of skin), qigong (coordinated movement, breathing, and awareness), tui na (massage), and other culturally unique practices. Such approaches are believed to be most effective in treating minor and chronic diseases, in part because of milder side effects. Traditional treatments may be used for more serious conditions as well, particularly for such acute abdominal conditions as appendicitis, pancreatitis, and gallstones; sometimes traditional treatments are used in combination with Western treatments. A traditional method of orthopedic treatment, involving less immobilization than Western methods, continued to be widely used in the 1980s.

== Employment insurance regulations ==
In 1951, the State Council issued the Regulations of the People's Republic of China on Labour Insurance, which is a sole proprietorship that stipulates the main recipient of the insurance medical treatment labor insurance medical treatment, and that reference could be made to workers of collectively owned enterprises in towns above the county level. However, the beneficiaries of the Labour Insurance Regulations were limited to state-run or more stable employment enterprises that provided more than 100 jobs, at a time when there were only about 1.2 million industrial workers in China, a tiny proportion of the 500 million Chinese population.

The coverage of the Labour Insurance Regulations was further extended in 1953 and 1956 respectively and was eventually introduced in all enterprises that were state-owned in 1956. The Labour Insurance Regulations were also introduced or applied by reference to the larger, better-off, collectively owned enterprises. But even so, the expanded beneficiary population still represents a very small proportion of the sizeable Chinese population. According to statistics for 1957, the urban population accounted for only 15.39% of the country's total population in that year, and the number of people employed in establishments and government departments with regular incomes totaled less than 20% of the urban population.

In the 1950s and early 1960s, employees of enterprises covered by the Labour Insurance Regulations were required to pay for medical treatment, surgery, hospitalization, and general medicine for general illnesses, non-work-related injuries, and disabilities, but the cost of expensive medicine, hospital meals, and travel expenses were borne by the employees themselves. In the event of illness of an immediate family member supported by the employee, he or she may be treated in the hospital of the enterprise or other special hospitals, and the enterprise shall bear half of the cost of surgery and ordinary medicine.

In 1966, the Ministry of Labour and the All-China Federation of Trade Unions issued the "Circular on Several Issues Concerning the Improvement of the Labour Insurance Medical System for Enterprise Workers," which appropriately lifted the burden of medical treatment on individual workers to prevent phenomena such as "soaking the sick" and "treating small illnesses in a big way."

The source of funding for labour insurance and medical care were covered by the administration of the enterprises before 1953. In 1953, the fund was changed to 5%–7% of the total wage according to the nature of the industry. To facilitate the coordinated use of the fund by enterprises, in 1969 the Ministry of Finance stipulated that the welfare fund, which had been withdrawn at 2.5% of total wages, the incentive fund, which had been withdrawn at 3%, and the medical and health fund, which had been withdrawn at 5.5%, were to be combined and replaced by an employee welfare fund, which was to be withdrawn at 11% of total wages and used mainly for medical and health expenses and welfare expenses.

== Primary care ==
After 1949 the Ministry of Public Health was responsible for all healthcare activities and established and supervised all facets of health policy. Along with a system of national, provincial, and local facilities, the ministry regulated a network of industrial and state enterprise hospitals and other facilities covering the health needs of workers of those enterprises. In 1981 this additional network provided approximately 25 percent of the country's total health services.

Health care was provided in both rural and urban areas through a three-tiered system. In rural areas, the first tier was made up of barefoot doctors working out of village medical centers. They provided preventive and primary-care services, with an average of two doctors per 1,000 people; given their importance as healthcare providers, particularly in rural areas, the government introduced measures to improve their performance through organized training and an annual licensing exam. At the next level were the township health centers, which functioned primarily as outpatient clinics for about 10,000 to 30,000 people each. These centers had about ten to thirty beds each, and the most qualified members of the staff were assistant doctors. The two lower-level tiers made up the "rural collective health system" that provided most of the country's medical care. Only the most seriously ill patients were referred to the third and final tier, the county hospitals, which served 200,000 to 600,000 people each and were staffed by senior doctors who held degrees from 5-year medical schools. Use of health services in rural areas has been shown to increase as a result of the rise in income in rural households and the government's substantial fiscal investment in health. Health care in urban areas was provided by paramedical personnel assigned to factories and neighborhood health stations. If more professional care was necessary the patient was sent to a district hospital, and the most serious cases were handled by municipal hospitals. To ensure a higher level of care, several state enterprises and government agencies sent their employees directly to the district or municipal hospitals, circumventing the paramedical, or barefoot doctor, stage. However, primary care in China has not developed as well as intended. The main barrier has been the scarcity of suitably-qualified health professionals.

== Gender and health care in China ==
=== Gender-affirming care ===
Although research on health care and gender in China often employs languages that are strictly gendered, access to gender affirming care in China remains an important issue to be examined. There is currently no national survey on the amount of individuals seeking gender affirming care. It is estimated that there are around 400,000 individuals seeking gender-affirming surgery in China in 2017. It is difficult for transgender and gender non-conforming individuals to access gender affirming care in China, and this has an adverse effect on both their physical well-being and mental health. There are minimal resources found with accessing gender affirming care (such as hormonal therapy or gender-affirming surgery) in China and high rates of suicide ideation and self-harm tendency are found in the transgender and gender non-conforming population. Transgender and gender non-conforming individuals in China have a high prevalence of depression, anxiety, and stress-related disorders. Due to the state's failure in regulating prescriptions drugs in general and silencing discourse related to trans people, many trans people have to access such prescription hormone replacement therapy (HRT) drugs through black markets, which comes with its own risks of inappropriate dosage/wrong combination and subpar quality.

In recent years progress has been made in regards to gender affirming care. The first medical team specializing in gender affirming care is placed in the Peking University Third Hospital. This is the first of its kind health care institution pioneering gender affirming care for trans people in China. In 2021, the first clinic providing gender affirming care to transgender children in China opened in Shanghai. In 2022, the National Health Commission of China published Management Specification on Gender Reassignment Technology, in which it requires gender replacement surgery be provided only to individuals who are at least 18 years old, unmarried, and have demonstrated desire to undergo the surgery for at least five years.

== Deficiencies and problems of health care in China ==
=== Medicare sustainability issues ===
China is a country with the fastest aging population on the largest scale in the world, and the family welfare structure is continuously weakened due to the declining birthrate and aging population. There will be even a greater demand for medical resources in the future. However, urban and rural residents are still expecting the state to subsidize the personal medical cost of diseases. At the same time, the growth rate of the national economy has dropped from double digits in the twentieth century to single digits; in 2016, it dropped to about 7%, and the growth rate of fiscal revenue has also dropped from over 20% to single digits. Therefore, the slowdown in the growth of national fiscal revenue and the rapid growth of national welfare has become an urgent dilemma.

In 2020, 18% of China's population were aged 60 or over. Due to its aging population, the prevalence of dementia and Alzheimer's disease is also growing. 13.1 million people live with dementia in China which is more than a quarter of all dementia cases globally. As the country's medical infrastructure for dementia is developing rapidly yet unevenly, the economic cost of dementia treatment is almost ten times higher than that of cancer and not covered by medical insurances in many regions. As a result of dementia being less recognised and treated in the healthcare system, the level of awareness of dementia as something caused by disease is relatively lower. At the same time, the local socio-cultural understandings of aging, "senility", and eldercare may have larger effects on care provision and the reception of medical services.

=== Hospitals refusing patients on regular national medicare ===
In 2010, to prevent the loss of medical insurance funds caused by fraudulent insurance and high-priced prescriptions, Jinan City began to assess the total hospital expenses, number of outpatient visits, and the medical insurance pooling fund for overspending will not be paid. Hospitals began to put pressure on doctors by deducting the income of departments and doctors if they exceeded the limit. Therefore, this practice led to the department rejecting medical insurance patients as soon as the quota is full. The hospital is most willing to accept patients such as self-funded patients, public-funded medical patients, and patients who receive health care from monopoly industries such as finance and electricity. The average age of employees in these industries are low, and so are the rates for their medical treatment. However, they are more capable of paying for their medical costs because of their insurance coverage through employment. As a result, hospitals were less willing to accept local patients who receive regular medical insurance. In 2016, the Second Xiangya Hospital of Central South University in Hunan, Kunming Children's Hospital, and the 82nd Army Hospital of the Chinese People's Liberation Army in Baoding 2019 also refused to accept patients who were on medicare.

In 2020, the Hebei Provincial Medical Security Bureau issued the "Notice on Preventing Medical Insurance Designated Medical Institutions to Prevaricate and Refuse to Accept Insured Persons", requiring medical security departments at all levels to conscientiously do a good job in ensuring the enjoyment of medical security benefits for insured persons during the end of the year, and resolutely put an end to prevarication and refusal of patients who received medicare.

=== Erosion of health insurance funds and excessive medical treatment ===
In 2016, a study reported that a large number of doctors and patients conspired to erode medical insurance funds in China. Several media outlets have disclosed that the ways of eroding the medical insurance fund included farmers being "hospitalized" for non-medical reasons, treating patients without illness, falsely reporting the number of days a patient is hospitalized, fake medication prescription, fake surgery, excessive unnecessary examinations, serious treatment of minor illnesses, repeated charges, creating empty charges, listing surgical treatment expenses that are not within the scope of reimbursement, and retail pharmacies accepting medical insurance cards for daily necessities. However, without the excessive use of medical insurance funds, some medical institutions will be unsustainable, and may not be able to pay wages or repay loans. In the year of 2019, China's medical insurance departments at all levels inspected a total of 815,000 designated medical institutions, and investigated and dealt with 264,000 medical institutions that violated laws and regulations; a total of 33,100 people who participated in violations of laws and regulations were dealt with, and a total of 11.556 billion yuan was recovered. At the same time, over-diagnosis, over-examination, and overmedication in the medical industry have become common phenomena due to the loss of profitability of hospitals and the supply of medicines, which wasted medical resources.

In response to these problems, various local government agencies have begun to coordinate and supervise medical insurance funds. They introduced the medical insurance monitoring systems to intelligently review medical insurance funds; they also mandated central purchase of pharmaceutical consumables to save money and increase the proportion of medical labor technology value in fund settlement.

=== Reasons for certain medicines' high price ===
Industry experts in mainland China believed that for a long time, the state medical authorities have not rejected the income-generating behavior of hospitals because medical care was cheap and generous, and they understood it was impossible to require high quality and cheap price at the same time. This is a congenital contradiction. Therefore, relatively high-price/quality medical services and medication were not excluded and hospitals sometimes used them for additional income and to support medical professionals with higher pay; this way, hospitals can retain talents and maybe even for doctors to study abroad and further their expertise. Therefore, in addition to the common phenomenon of hospitals investing in pharmacies, it was also a norm for salesmen of many pharmaceutical companies to travel to doctors' homes to offer dividends. Sometimes there are no standard answers to prescribing medicine for many diseases, and the dosage may also depend on the case. At this time, prescribing a certain drug and the dosage becomes the doctor's discretion. Therefore, the salesperson of the pharmaceutical factory and the doctor may have common interests.

Another problem is that the laws and regulations give hospital administrators too much discretion and power. Although all medicines are listed in the medical insurance payment catalog, no law stipulates that all medicines in the hospital pharmacy must be purchased in certain quantities. This presents a feasible way for hospitals to make money by instructing patients to purchase medicines in certain pharmacies at their own expense. In the beginning of 2019, the General Office of the State Council issued the document "Opinions on Strengthening the Performance Evaluation of Tertiary Public Hospitals". The gray area of drug prices caused by hospitals conspiring with local pharmacies has been noticed; hospitals in various provinces and cities received this outline document, and finally regulated this practice in hospitals, but this regulation may take many years to achieve. At this stage, patients, unfortunately, encounter problem of having to pay for certain medicines their own expense when they didn't have to, but they can defend their rights and interests using legal disputes listed below:

1. Patients or their family members can check the medical insurance drug catalog at any time to identify whether their medication is in the catalog
2. When the doctor recommends a pharmacy that requires you to pay out of pocket, you must refuse it decisively and check with the catalog
3. When the doctor says that "the drug store is out of stock and the hospital did not enter this medicine" as an excuse, the doctor is required to start an additional procurement process
4. If the additional procurement process has not been approved within a reasonable time of two to three days, you can report directly to the Municipal Health and Health Commission or the provincial Health and Health Commission at a higher level.

=== Putian system of private hospitals ===
Starting from the 1990s, businesspeople from the city of Putian in Fujian came to dominate the system of Chinese private hospitals, with approximately 80% of private hospitals in China (around 8,000 facilities) by the mid 2010s owned by people connected to the city. This initially started with deals to operate certain departments of Chinese military hospitals. Sixth Tone stated that hospitals run by the "Putian system" had a "a reputation for pushing treatments on patients who don’t need them.", with doctor Chen Xiaolan stating that they tend to "overprescribe medication in exchange for financial incentives", that the equipment and medicine at some of their hospitals are fake and many employees do not have a proper medical background. The New York Times stated that a number of Putian system hospitals had "fabricated patients’ testimonies and doctors’ credentials. Others listed false certifications or used outdated treatments". This system came under scrutiny in 2016 with the death of the cancer patient Wei Zexi, who was given an unproven cancer treatment at a "Putian system"-operated hospital. The owners of the hospitals earned large fortunes from the network. In 2018, the New York Times stated that "The Putian network became the emblem of unfettered corruption within the private health care system."

== See also ==
- Health in China
- Healthcare reform in China

== References and further reading ==
- Xu, Judy; Yang, Yue (2009). "Traditional Chinese Medicine in the Chinese Health Care System". Health Policy. 90 (2): 133–139. doi:10.1016/j.healthpol.2008.09.003. PMC 7114631. PMID 18947898.
- Zhi, WANG; et al. (October 2024). "基于机构流向法的全国中医药总费用变化趋势及流向分析" [Analysis on the trend and flow of total expenditure of traditional Chinese medicine in China based on the institutional flow method]. 中国卫生经济 (in Chinese). 43 (9): 40–43. ISSN 1003-0743. – covers 2016-2021, has figures on total and TCM expenditures
- Bingnan, BAI; et al. (2018). "基于机构流向法的全国医院中医药费用研究分析" [Research and analysis on the expenditure of traditional Chinese medicine in hospitals across the country based on the institutional flow method]. 中国医院 (in Chinese). 22 (1): 26–28. ISSN 1671-0592. – covers 2011-2015, has figures on TCM expenditures
