= Barefoot doctor =

1968–1981 doctor in rural China

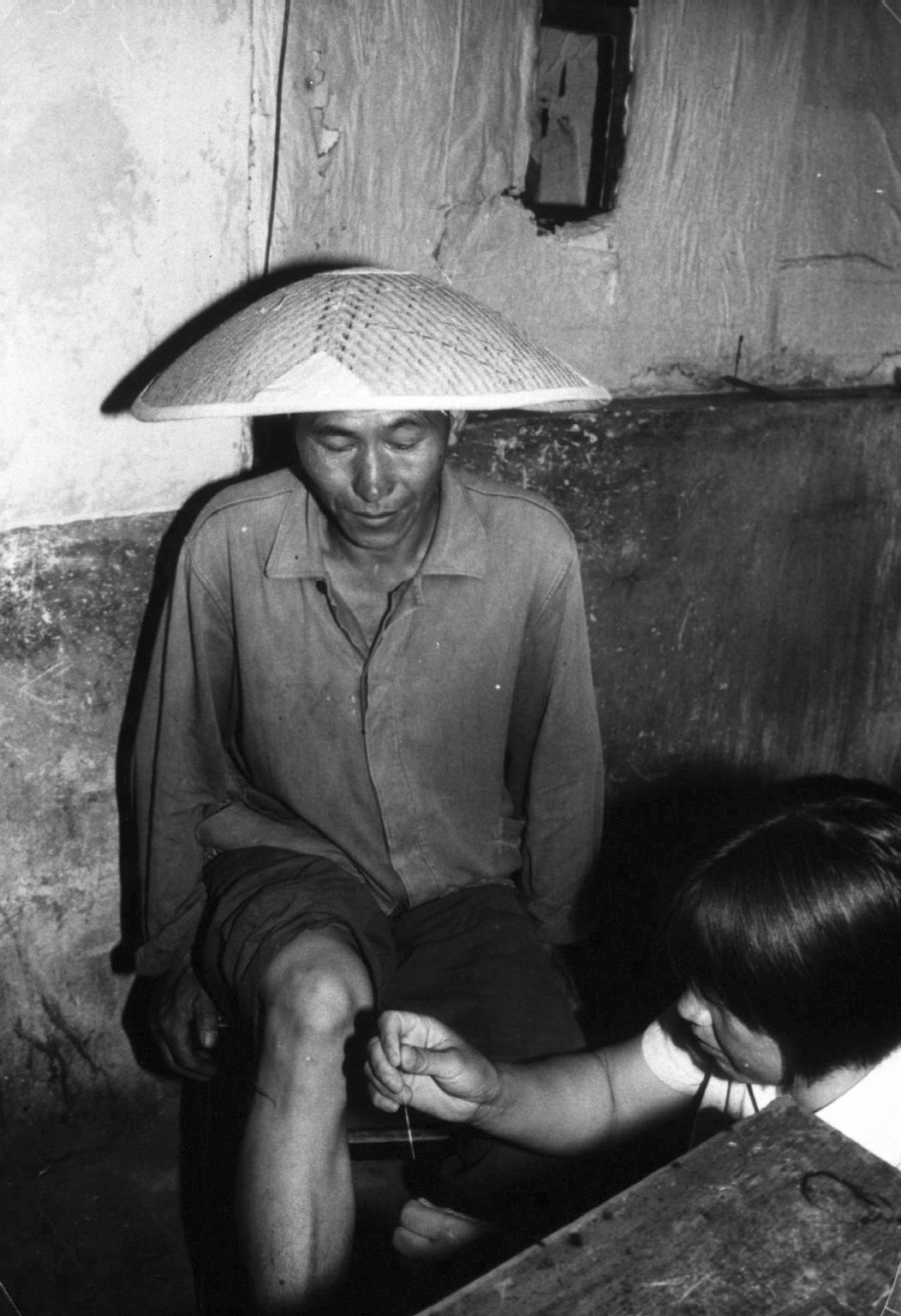
A barefoot doctor performs acupuncture on a man

Barefoot doctors (simplified Chinese: 赤脚医生; traditional Chinese: 赤腳醫生; pinyin: chìjiǎo yīshēng) were healthcare providers who underwent basic medical training and worked in rural villages in China. They included farmers, folk healers, rural healthcare providers, and recent middle or secondary school graduates who received minimal basic medical and paramedical education. Their purpose was to bring healthcare to rural areas where urban-trained doctors would not settle. They promoted basic hygiene, preventive healthcare, and family planning and treated common illnesses. The name comes from southern farmers, who would often work barefoot in the rice paddies, and simultaneously worked as medical practitioners.

In the 1930s, the Rural Reconstruction Movement had pioneered village health workers trained in basic health as part of a coordinated system, and there had been provincial experiments after 1949, but after Mao Zedong's healthcare speech in 1965 the concept was developed and institutionalized. China's health policy began to emphasize the importance of barefoot doctors after Mao Zedong's June 26 directive, and, in 1968, the barefoot doctors program became integrated into national policy. These programs were called "rural cooperative medical systems" (RCMS) and worked to include community participation with the rural provision of health services.

Barefoot doctors became a part of the Cultural Revolution, which also radically diminished the influence of the Ministry of Health, which was filled with Western-trained doctors. Still, barefoot doctors continued to introduce scientific medicine to rural areas by merging it with Chinese medicine. With the onset of market-oriented reforms after the Cultural Revolution, political support for barefoot doctors dissipated, and "health-care crises of peasants substantially increased after the system broke down in the 1980s." Although the official barefoot doctor system came to an end, the legacy of the barefoot doctors inspired the 1978 World Health Organization conference on primary health care and the resulting Alma Ata Declaration.

== Background ==
In the lead up to the Cultural Revolution, healthcare in China was a complex and varied system. The Rural Reconstruction Movement of the 1930s spurred greater investment in rural healthcare, and experimental rural health programs in 1950s Shanghai helped shape the barefoot doctor policies that would follow. Different types of medical practitioners served rural citizens, who had limited access to elite physicians concentrated mainly in urban centers. There was also tension between proponents of traditional Chinese medicine and the scientific medicine that was gradually being introduced to the country.

Rural healthcare began to shift significantly in 1949 with the establishment of the People's Republic of China. The new government prioritized healthcare, emphasizing preventive medicine and the integration of scientific approaches with traditional Chinese medicine. State owned union clinics operated by local doctors emerged as one solution to the shortage of rural healthcare, however, despite this new focus on centralized healthcare and public health, significant disparities between urban and rural health services persisted.

Mao Zedong drew attention to this gap in what became known as the June 26th Directive, in which he criticized the urban bias of China's medical system and called for greater focus on the wellbeing of the rural population. This concern was driven by the fact that 80–90% of China's population lived in rural areas. Although barefoot doctors had existed before the directive, they became far more widespread afterward, as China began training them in much greater numbers. The directive is therefore considered the beginning of the formalized barefoot doctor system, with the goal of training one barefoot doctor for every 1,000 citizens. The concept was introduced as policy through the Red Flag journal and soon transformed rural healthcare. The union clinics of earlier years were reorganized into commune clinics under the cooperative medical service, and physicians became government employees working in state-owned facilities.

== Selected individuals ==
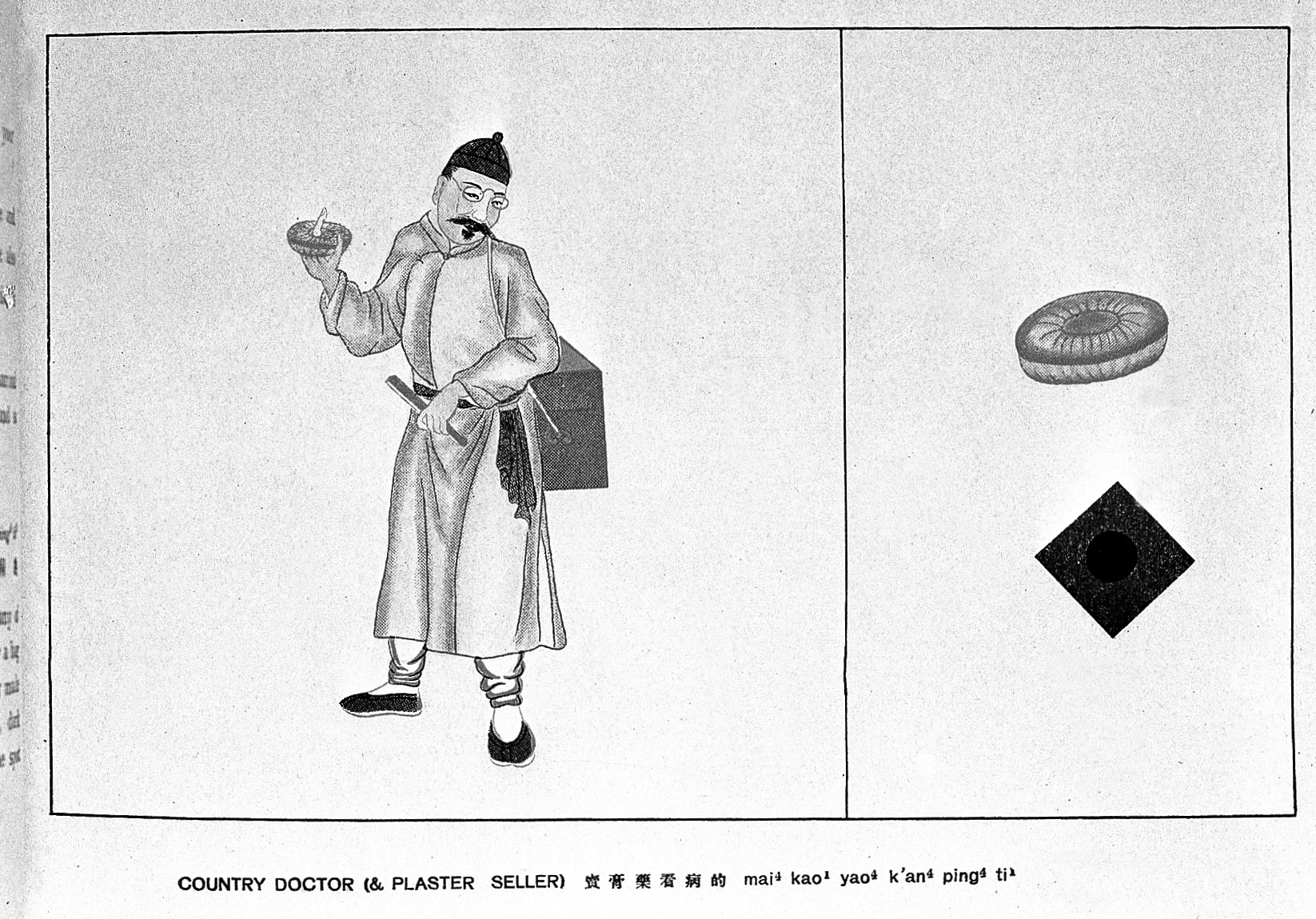
A depiction of a Chinese country doctor, analogous to the folk healers who fed into the barefoot doctor system

The initial pool of barefoot doctors required no education or training as they were sourced from healthcare providers already working in rural areas as well as urban doctors. As Gross (2018) mentions, an important part of Mao's plan was the movement of sending doctors, to serve in the countryside (Chinese: 下鄉; pinyin: xìaxiāng). Mao pushed for medical school graduates to be sent to work in rural areas, where he felt they could help the rural inhabitants while, as Gross (2018) and Fang (2012) explain, also redistributing talent from urban to rural areas. They would live in an area for half a year to a year and continue the education of the barefoot doctors. According to Fang's (2012) research on Hangzhou Prefecture, many of the urban doctors sent to rural areas were quite unhappy about their fate. In fact, being sent to rural areas was often seen as a punishment because of the lower wages and challenges of rural living. Hesketh and Wei (1997), on the other hand, mention that although some were unhappy, other urban doctors were grateful for the lessons they learned while living as peasants.

However, more medical practitioners were necessary, and the state turned to both rural residents and urban ones. These barefoot doctors were usually chosen by members of the commune where the barefoot doctor would then serve. Often, "young farmers" were selected to train to become barefoot doctors. Other barefoot doctors originally worked as folk doctors and retrained to become barefoot doctors after the Cultural Revolution. Some trainees were also recent graduates of middle school. Barefoot doctors were often fairly young, which Fang (2012) attributes to the fact that the state wanted them to be able to support rural healthcare for the foreseeable future. Fang (2012) also describes that physically weak or disabled people often trained to become barefoot doctors, as the job was much less hard on the body than agricultural labor.

The nature of the barefoot doctor system also allowed women to enter a profession that had previously been dominated by men. Fang (2012) explains that, due to tradition, many females felt uncomfortable being examined by male doctors, and, as a result, silently had a host of diseases, especially gynecological ones. However, the barefoot doctor system required that each village have a female doctor. With this push, women's health improved significantly, although Fang (2012) mentions that health disparities were still present.

== Education and training ==
In the beginning, barefoot doctors only needed to have primary school education. Later, barefoot doctors had to have graduated from secondary school and then received three to six months of training at a county or community hospital. This educational change was because their "literacy levels were linked to their medical proficiency." As Hesketh and Wei (1997) indicate, this training was often provided by medical professionals who had been sent away from their urban homes to work in rural areas. Training was not standardized across the nation, as different areas had different needs. In general, preventative care, vaccinations, and disease identification were skills taught to barefoot doctors-in-training. Thus, duration and curriculum of the training was adjusted to fit the specific needs a region's barefoot doctor was meant to fill. As Fang points out, "the training of barefoot doctors during the late 1960s and 1970s was brief, ranging from ten days to a year at either county hospitals or health schools, and district/commune clinics." Through this training system, Hesketh and Wei's (1997) count indicates that about one million barefoot doctors were prepared to serve in the countryside. The PRC, during this time, collected many textbooks and medical training guides for barefoot doctors: including "treatment of common diseases, first aid, family planning, basic surgical skills, and human anatomy." Although, training was mostly focused on epidemic disease prevention, curing simple ailments that were common in the specific area. Barefoot doctors were also trained to use scientific medicines and techniques. Because of this, Fang's (2012) research shows that barefoot doctors were often the first to introduce scientific medicine to rural villagers. Through this introduction, scientific medicine existed side by side with Chinese medicine in the rural areas. According to Wang (1975) and Gross (2018), this coexistence created a productive and innovative new system that brought together the positive aspects of each because Chinese medicine was much cheaper and required less equipment than scientific medicine. Thus costs were kept down but quality of care was still high because Chinese medicine practitioners had to receive scientific medicine training and scientific medicine practitioners had to receive Chinese medicine training as part of the barefoot doctor program. Literacy inhibited some from becoming barefoot doctors. The training system required students to be literate, and thus illiterate folk doctors were unable to retrain as barefoot doctors. And, for those who were literate, the barefoot doctor training provided a level of education most rural villagers never attained.

== Work ==
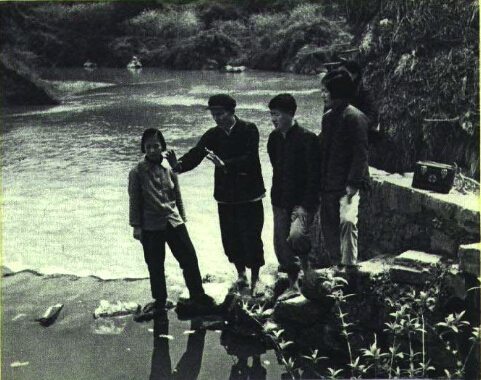
Hunan Provincial Medical Patrol in a Xiangxi village, 1966

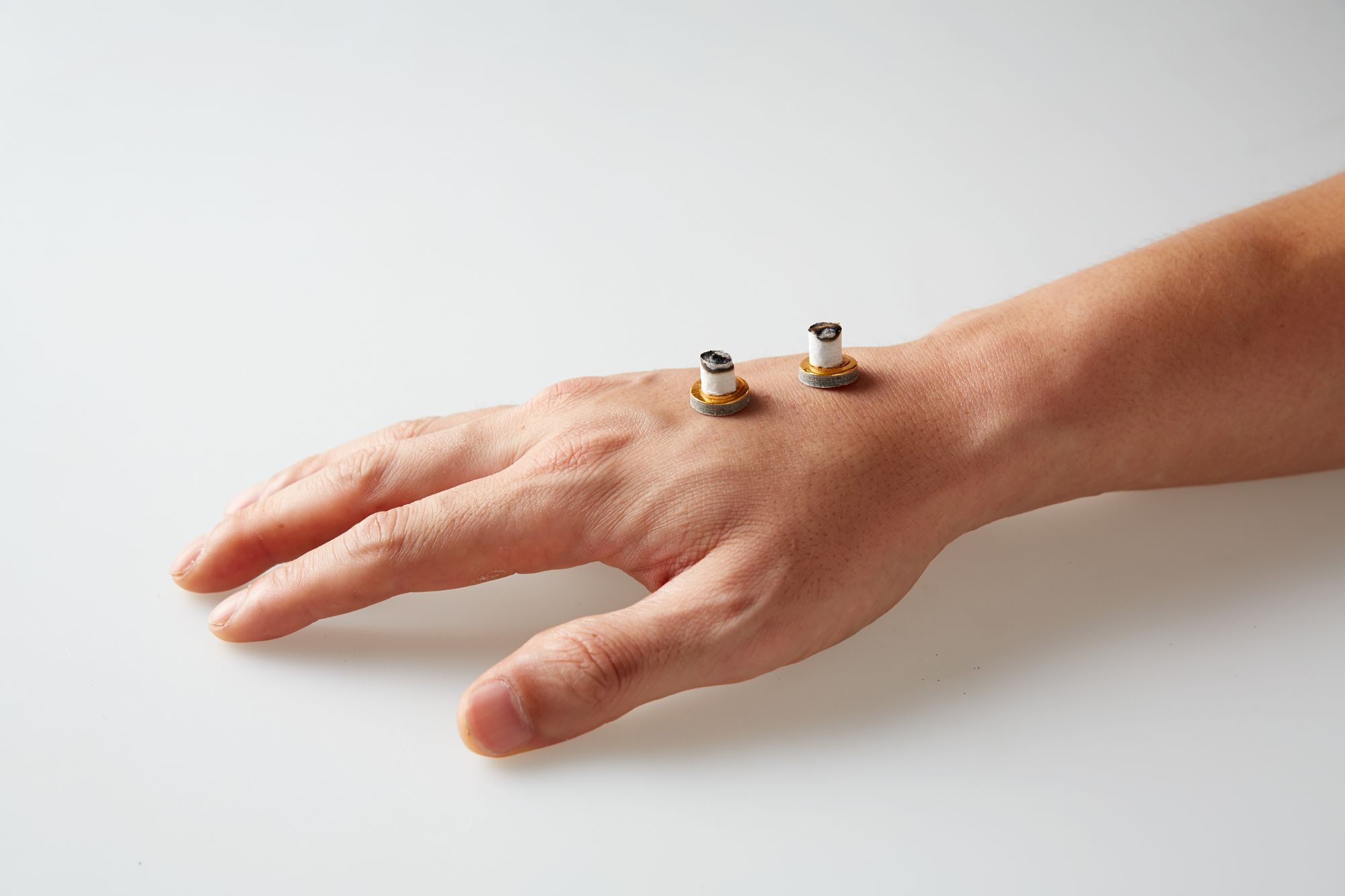
Example of moxibustion

=== Scope of practice ===
Barefoot doctors acted as primary healthcare providers at the grass-roots level. They were given a set of medicines, both scientific and Chinese, that they would dispense. Often they grew their own herbs in the backyard. Alternatively, practitioners went on herb-collection trips twice a year, which served to replenish the medicinal herb supply in rural areas. Gross (2018) describes that herbs provided an inexpensive, easily accessible method for rural healthcare in contrast to the expensive tools used by scientific medicine. As Rosenthal (1982) mentions Mao had called for, they tried to integrate both scientific and Chinese medicine, like acupuncture and moxibustion. According to Ots (2015) and Fang (2012), not only did the barefoot doctors introduce scientific medicine to rural areas, but they also helped facilitate a resurgence in interest in Chinese medicine. Ots (2015) explains that Chinese medicine had previously been pushed away in favor of scientific medicine in elite physician circles. Gross (2018) shows that with Mao's June 26 directives, the previously negative attitudes toward Chinese medicine began to shift in favor of appreciating Chinese medicine as a symbol of China's rich culture. An important feature of the barefoot doctor was that they were still involved in farm work. Barefoot doctors often spent as much as 50 percent of their time on farming, which Rosenthal (1982) explains meant that the rural farmers perceived them as peers and created a sense of equality between physician and patient. The barefoot doctors were integrated into a system where they could refer seriously ill people to township and county hospitals.

Barefoot doctors provided mostly primary healthcare services and focused on prevention rather than treatment. They provided immunizations, delivery for pregnant women, and improvement of sanitation. Health aides provided help and back-up to the barefoot doctors, although they usually spent most of their time as farmers and only 10% of their time helping out. The village hosting the barefoot doctors and health aides funded the materials required for medical care.

The proliferation of barefoot doctors in the early 1970s increased abortion access in rural China. They also had an important role for disseminating information about birth control. Barefoot doctors guides generally contained chapters dedicated to family planning with descriptions of birth control techniques, IUDs, oral birth control, and the rhythm method. Such guides varied significantly by region in which they were published.

=== Income and cost ===
The income of the barefoot doctors was calculated as if it were agricultural work; they were paid roughly half of what a classically trained doctor made. Barefoot doctors were primarily compensated by the villages in which they worked. This funding came from collective welfare funds as well as from local farmer contributions (from 0.5% to 2% of their annual incomes). This program was successful in part because the doctors were selected and paid by their own villages. Perhaps because many of the barefoot doctors previously worked as farmers, they earned their living both with their work as barefoot doctors and with agricultural jobs on the side. However, barefoot doctors "had a better social and economic status in the rural community" which allowed for them to substitute their agricultural work for their medical work as barefoot doctors. As for costs to patients, these were not standardized and varied by village. Some barefoot doctor brigades charged nothing for their services, and others charged nominal fees. By the 1960s, there were Rural Co-operative Medical Schemes (RCMS) programs in 90% of China's rural villages.

However, funding was still a big issue since the government had to think about how to make the program affordable and sustainable. "In 1969, the government reduced the costs for 1,230 kinds of pharmaceuticals by 37.2 percent, which had a very negative impact on its coffers, especially after the nationwide promotion of the barefoot doctors program." This caused for the government to push for more traditional Chinese herbs since they were cheaper than scientific medicine.

== End of barefoot doctors in China ==
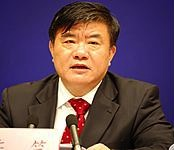
Chen Zhu, China's former Minister of Health

=== Switch to village doctors ===
As of 2008, two-thirds of the village doctors practicing in rural China began their training as barefoot doctors. This includes Chen Zhu, China's former Minister of Health, who practiced as a barefoot doctor for five years before going on to receive additional training.

The barefoot doctor system was abolished in 1981 with the rise of Deng Xiaoping and the end of the commune system of agricultural cooperatives. The new economic policy in China promoted a shift from collectivism to individual production by the family unit. The barefoot doctor model officially ended during the Chinese Medical Reformation of 1985, when the term 'barefoot doctor' was removed from the healthcare system and replaced with the term and concept of 'village doctors'. This shift caused a privatization of the medical system, which marginalized barefoot doctors and their focus on preventive medicine and primary healthcare. The barefoot doctors were given the option to take a national exam; if they passed, they became village doctors, if not, they would become primary health workers. Some village doctors later entered medical school. In contrast, some doctors began to abandon their medical work causing the number of barefoot doctors to drop "from 1.5 million in 1975 to just over 1.2 million 1983."

Soon after the barefoot doctor system came to an end, in the years between 1977 and 1989, village doctors began charging patients for their services. Because of the new economic incentives, they began to shift their focus to the treatment of chronic conditions rather than preventative care. By 1984, village RCMS coverage had dropped from 90% to 4.8%. Without the public-service oriented work of barefoot doctors, "health-care crises of peasants substantially increased after the system broke down in the 1980s." With health care privatization, the central government played an increasingly smaller role in the national healthcare. Most importantly, the central government began contributing less funds to healthcare, placing the responsibility on local governments. These individual, local governments had to collect funds through taxation, which led to imbalances between areas with wealthy and poor citizens.

Village doctors started to support themselves by charging their patients as private entrepreneurs. They also switched to more "curative work" like giving IV drips, injections, and prescriptions. However, because of the abrupt end to the barefoot doctor system, some village doctors went through many hardships and "now find themselves pensionless." In the 1990s a case of the "old serving the old" has become more frequent. This is because the younger village doctors have migrated elsewhere which leave the elderly barefoot doctors who need healthcare themselves. The already old barefoot doctors take on their task of taking care of the elderly on "meagre incomes" and with no pensions.

=== New healthcare systems ===
In 1989, the Chinese government tried to restore a cooperative healthcare system in the rural provinces by launching a nationwide primary healthcare program. This effort increased coverage up to 10% by 1993. In 1994, the government established a program to reestablish primary healthcare coverage for the rural population, but the efforts remain largely unsuccessful due to the market-oriented nature of healthcare.

Eventually, the severe acute respiratory syndrome epidemic exposed the struggles of China's healthcare system and drove the government to reinvent the medical system to prevent any future epidemics. In 2003 the Chinese government proposed a new cooperative medical system, known as the New Rural Cooperative Medical Scheme, that is operated and funded by the government. This program is run more like an insurance program. By 2010, over 90% of rural Chinese residents received healthcare through NRCMS. It pays 10 Renminbi to 20 Renminbi (sources disagree) per year for each person covered by the program, and ensures coverage for serious diseases. Households themselves also contribute a fee of 10 Renminbi. This new program relies heavily on lessons learned from the times of the barefoot doctors, but faces many challenges in providing sufficient, cost-effective care for China's rural populations.

== Outcomes and reception ==
=== Results ===
The work of the barefoot doctors effectively reduced healthcare costs in the People's Republic of China and provided primary care treatment to the rural farming population. The World Health Organization (WHO) regarded RCMS as a "successful example of solving shortages of medical services in rural areas". China's entrance into the United Nations (UN) and WHO, raised the visibility of the barefoot doctors' effectiveness of providing primary healthcare at an affordable cost. Moreover, the success of the barefoot doctor model demonstrates that many diseases in poor countries can be prevented and solved without significant financial resources or technological transformation. Instead, both Zhang and Unschuld (2008) and Cueto (2004) show that the barefoot doctor system exemplifies that adequate political focus on support of rural-based and non-commercial forms of preventive healthcare and primary care treatments can change the health landscape of a nation. According to research by Hu (1975), the barefoot doctor system increased the ratio of doctors to rural residents from 1: 8000 before the Cultural Revolution to 1: 760 between 1969 and mid-1974. Public health improvements attributed to the barefoot doctor system are numerous. Nationwide, Chinese citizens were living longer, with an " [increased life expectancy] of 35 to 68 years" and infants were more likely to survive, with an infant mortality drop "from 200 to 34 deaths per 1000 live births". Through such significant improvements, the state of China's public health was nearing that of more Western countries toward the end of the barefoot doctor era. The main health issues of Chinese citizen became "more chronic conditions" that came along with the new longer life expectancy, such as heart disease, rather than "infectious diseases" and preventable illnesses, which were instead minimized through the new healthcare structure. How much of this can be attributed to the barefoot doctors themselves is difficult to establish, but, at least in rural areas, they certainly played a role.

=== Historical legacy ===
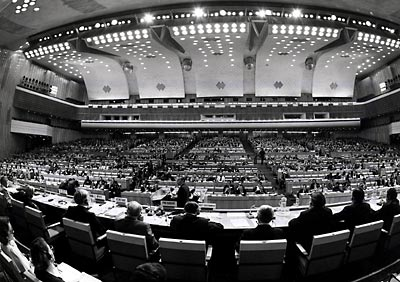
Photo from 1978 conference on primary health care in Alma-Ata, Kazakhstan

According to the WHO itself (2008) and Lee and Kim (2018), the 1978 joint conference by the World Health Organization (WHO) and UNICEF in Alma-Ata, Kazakhstan, received some inspiration from the barefoot doctors system. There, the Alma Ata Declaration (otherwise known as the Primary Health Care Initiative), which lauded the benefits of primary care, as seen in the barefoot doctor system, was signed unanimously. This was hailed as a revolutionary breakthrough in international health ideology - it called for local communities participating in deciding healthcare priorities, called for an emphasis on primary and preventive healthcare, and most importantly sought to link medicine with trade, economics, industry, rural politics and other political and social areas.

The resurgence of interest in preventive medicine, primary healthcare, and holistic approaches to social welfare worldwide is leading to positive revisitations of the legacy of barefoot doctors. Political restrictions against discussion of the Cultural Revolution in China, however, limit the extent of this debate in China itself.

=== International development with NGOs ===
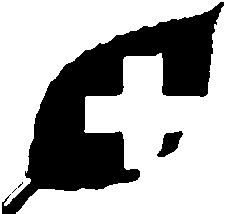
MAPD's logo

In 1977, Jean-Pierre Willem created an international humanitarian apolitical non-governmental organization of doctors called Médecins aux pieds nus (MAPD) in France. The name of the organization means "barefoot doctors", an homage to the barefoot doctors of China. Volunteers work in Burundi, Colombia and Southeast Asia with local healers to develop "medical garden" for herbalism and make essential oils for gemmotherapy. In 1999, Jean-Claude Rodet became the first president of Médecins aux pieds nus Canada, working with Mark Smith in the United States. This NGO leads ethnobiological missions based on "proximity, prevention and humility".

== See also ==
- Health in China
- Healthcare in China
- Barefoot lawyer
- Medical missions in China
- Heilpraktiker a category of alternative health workers in Germany and Switzerland
- Barber surgeon a historical category of health worker in Eastern Europe
- Feldsher
- Nurse practitioner
