= Guy Trédaniel =

French publisher

Éditions Guy Trédaniel
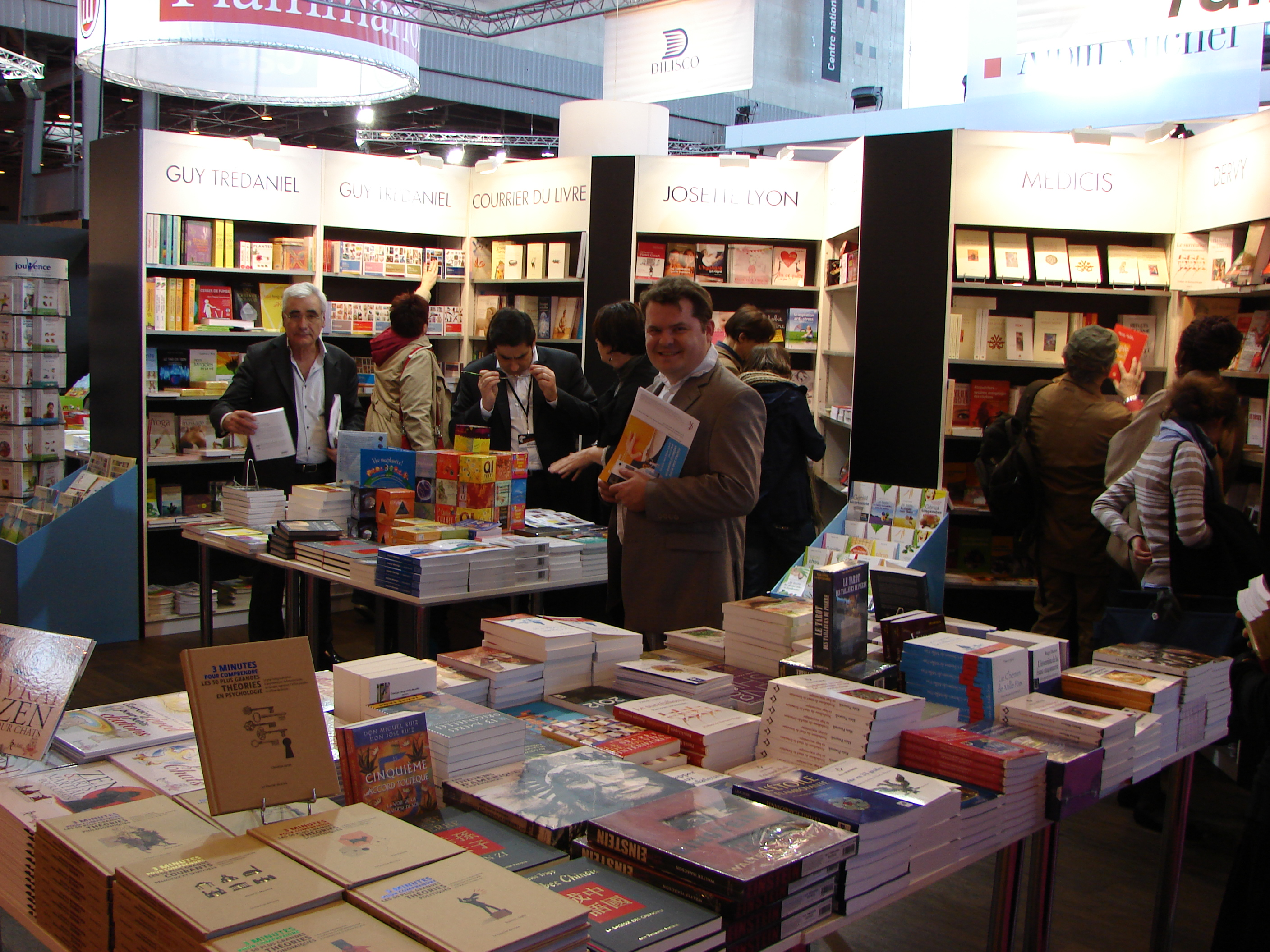
- Éditions Guy Trédaniel - Book fair 2012
- Occupation: publisher
- Website: www.editions-tredaniel.com

Guy Trédaniel is a French publisher who founded in 1974 Éditions Guy Trédaniel, a printing company based in Paris, France.

== Best-seller authors ==
- Michel Saloff Coste
- Jean-Pierre Willem
- Michel Gauquelin
- Pierre Plantard
- (Don Ernesto Ortiz)
