= Gemmotherapy =

Pseudoscience on using sap from trees for health

Gemmotherapy [from Lat. gemma, bud, and New Lat. therapīa, Grk. therapeia, medical treatment] is a pseudoscientific group of remedies from embryonic tissue of various trees and shrubs, buds, emerging shoots, seeds, catkins, rootlets and sap.

This raw material is taken at the peak time of the tree or shrubs' germination. It is claimed that unknown plant hormones and enzymes are released during this process which can somehow improve health.

== Development and spread of gemmotherapy ==
The therapeutic effects of embryonic material of plants were first investigated in the late 1950s by a Belgian homeopath, Pol Henry working with a group of French homeopaths .

Henry initially called the new type of medicine, phytoembryotherapy which was later renamed, gemmotherapy. Gemmotherapy was included in herbal therapies in France in the Pharmacopée Francaise in 1965.

== Lack of evidence of efficacy ==
There is no evidence of therapeutic efficacy for gemmotherapy.

Although scientific knowledge about the healing effects of plants is still increasing, gemmotherapy has not yet been the subject of any serious scientific publication. It has not been the subject of any randomized double-blind study, the only method recognized as reliable, nor has it been published in a recognized professional journal.
