= Société d'Encouragement au Progrès =

Société d'Encouragement au Progrès is a NGO fighting for initiative, responsibility and progress headquartered in Paris (France). It publishes a quarterly review called La Tribune du Progrès.

In 2009, the article "Cancer: curing is good, preventing is better" awarded André Gernez.

== Founders ==
- Albert Lebrun
- Paul Painlevé
- Louis Cailletet
- Lumière brothers
- Édouard Belin
- Edouard Branly
