= Alain Deloche =

French surgeon (born 1940)

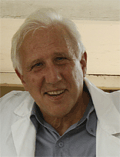
Alain Deloche

Alain Deloche (born 2 September 1940 in Paris) is a French surgeon. Ex member of Médecins Sans Frontières, he cofounded Médecins du Monde and is board member of the Surgeons of Hope Foundation since 1988.

== See also ==
- Albert Schweitzer
