= Heilpraktiker =

Naturopathic profession in Germany

Heilpraktiker ("healing practitioner") is a naturopathic profession in Germany. It is recognized as an alternative and complementary health care profession by German law.

== Profession in Germany ==
A Heilpraktiker, or a non-medical healing practitioner, is recognized as an alternative and complementary health care profession by German law. A heilpraktiker does not need to have any formal education or training but must do an exam at the health authorities. This exam used to be somewhat basic until the 1980s, at which time it was made much more demanding. A candidate needs to have good knowledge of medical sciences, such as anatomy, physiology and pathology and psychiatry; a good knowledge of law regulations is also needed. Heilpraktiker often specialize in a complementary and alternative field of healthcare that could be anything from faith healing, homeopathy, phytotherapy, Chinese medicine, Ayurvedic medicine, to reflexology or acupuncture. A heilpraktiker is a person who is allowed to practice as a non-medical practitioner using any unconventional therapy.

=== History ===
The profession of heilpraktiker is based on healing therapies beginning in the Middle Ages. The lîbarzet Jörg Radendorfer from Vienna received rights that were otherwise restricted to academic physicians around 1496 in Frankfurt, which were withdrawn in 1499 after protests of doctors and pharmacists, and the death of a patient. He then worked in Nuremberg from 1500 to around 1503.

After the First World War, the heilpraktiker began to organise. They formed an association "Verband der Heilkundigen Deutschlands" in Essen in 1920, which was renamed "Großverband der Heilpraktiker Deutschlands" ("Great Association of the Healing Practitioners of Germany") in 1928. By 1931, 22 organisations of heilpraktiker had been established. In 1933, the Nazi Reichsministerium des Innern appointed the heilpraktiker Ernst Heinrich as commissioner of the profession. Per the Gleichschaltung, all associations were combined in a central Heilpraktikerbund Deutschland, with enforced rules for membership and education. The organisation published the magazine Der Heilpraktiker first in August 1933.

The Nazis promoted heilpraktiker as a counter within alternative medicine to the "occult" practices of anthroposophy. Alternative medicine researcher Edzard Ernst has written about the links between heilpraktiker and Nazism, and described it as "a relic from the Nazis that endangers public health" in a series of blog posts, also arguing against extension of the practice. Heilpraktiker have been identified as involved with fake cancer cures. A law regarding the profession of heilpraktiker was issued on 18 February 1939, named "Erste Durchführungsverordnung zum Gesetz über die berufsmäßige Ausübung der Heilkunde ohne Bestallung" ("First regulation implementing the law on the professional practice of medicine without bestowal"), or short: Heilpraktikergesetz.

=== Organisation ===
According to the Statistisches Bundesamt, 45,000 heilpraktiker were accredited in Germany in 2017. They are organised in several associations which represent the interests of the profession and offer education and services. Several associations run schools.

- Allgemeiner Deutscher Heilpraktikerverband (ADHV)
- Arbeitsgemeinschaft Anthroposophischer Heilpraktiker-Berufsverband (AGAHP)
- Berufsverband Deutsche Naturheilkunde (BDN)
- Bund Deutscher Heilpraktiker (BDH)
- Bund Deutscher Heilpraktiker und Naturheilkundiger (BDHN)
- Fachverband Deutscher Heilpraktiker (FDH)
- Freie Heilpraktiker (FH)
- Freier Verband Deutscher Heilpraktiker (FVDH)
- Union Deutscher Heilpraktiker (UDH)
- Verband Deutscher Heilpraktiker (VDH)
- Verband Heilpraktiker Deutschland (VHD)
- Verband Unabhängiger Heilpraktiker (VUH)
- Vereinigung Christlicher Heilpraktiker (VCHP)

They collaborate in the organisation Die Deutschen Heilpraktikerverbände (The German Heilpraktiker Associations). Beginning in 2011, five associations have collaborated in the umbrella organisation Dachverband Deutscher Heilpraktikerverbände (DDH). The central organisation has published a magazine Volksheilkunde.

== Education ==
While there is no regulated curriculum to become heilpraktiker, several schools offer classes.
