= Thomas Walther (lawyer) =

German lawyer

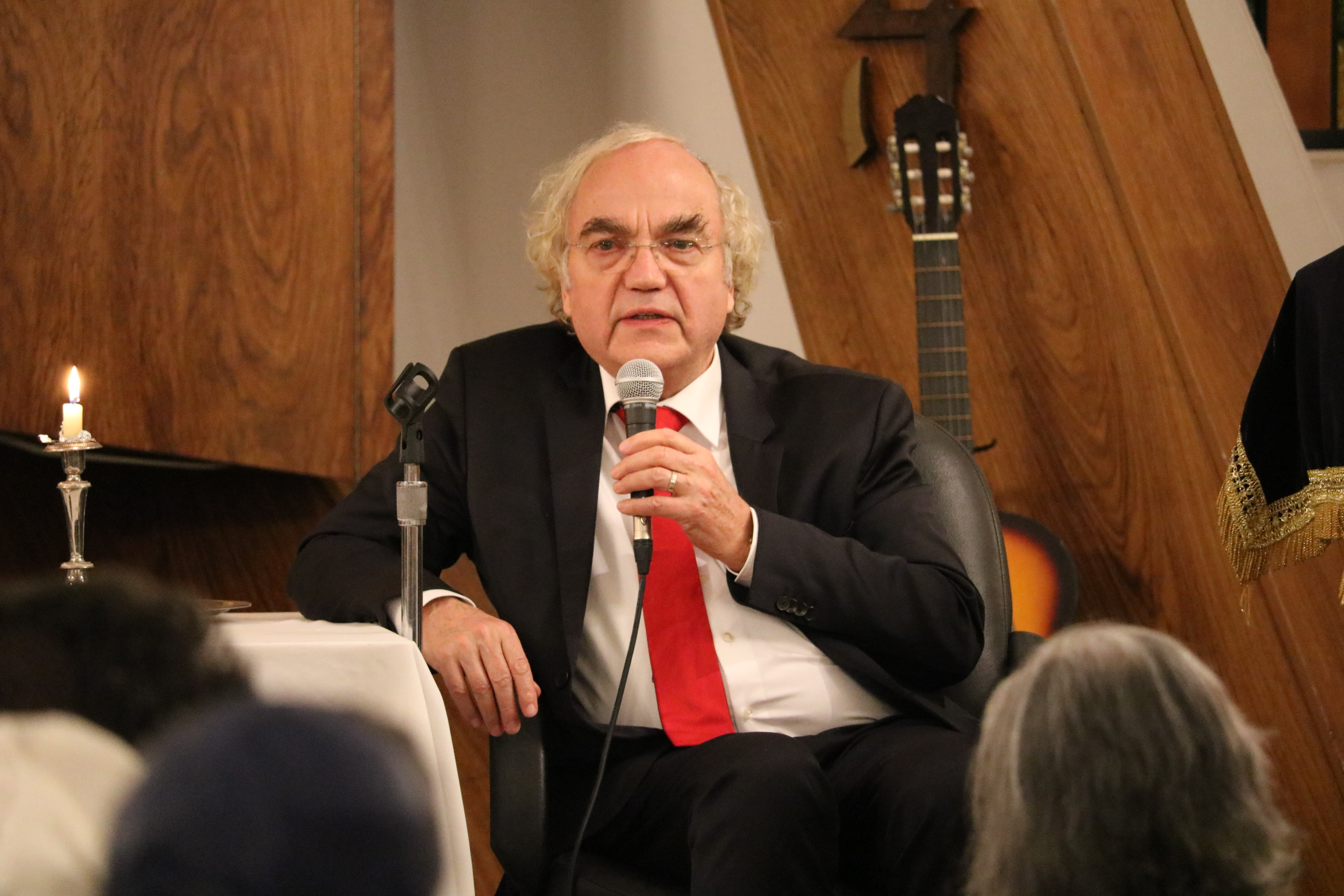
Walther in 2016

Justice Thomas Walther (born 1943) is a lawyer based in Kempten, in the province of Bavaria in Germany. He is a former judge and German federal prosecutor for the Central Office of the State Justice Administrations for the Investigation of National Socialist Crimes. He is known as the "last of the Nazi hunters" for his work in setting legal precedent in seeking punishment for former SS officers and guards who were involved in the Holocaust, whether directly responsible for deaths or not.

== Early life ==
His father Rudolph saved two Jewish families during the Kristallnacht anti-Jewish riots of 1938. "My father had quite a lot of Jewish friends in the '30s and he had hidden two families in our big garden during the Night of Broken Glass and they stayed there for some weeks until they had organized their escape to Australia and Paraguay."

== High-profile cases ==
=== Demanjuk case ===
After 23 years, he retired as a judge in 2006, joining the Central Office for the Investigation of Nazi Crimes, setting out to change the precedent on prosecuting Nazi guards. After the war, it is estimated that between 7,000 and 8,000 SS guards served at Auschwitz. Before Walther became a Nazi hunter, only 48 were convicted. In 2011, after standing trial for two years, German courts decided to convict John Demjanjuk without any direct evidence of murder –simply by being a guard who watched thousands march to their death made him complicit in the murder of 27,900 Dutch Jews at Sobibor. Demjanjuk, 91, was found guilty in May 2011 of helping to murder more than 28,000 Jews at Sobibor and sentenced to five years in prison. He was released pending an appeal and was moved to a nursing home.

The two major contributions Walther helped bring into law were that a Nazi did not have to be directly involved to be guilty of aiding and abetting a murder during the Holocaust; and a Holocaust survivor who testifies in a German court does not have to directly identify the defendant. Walther took this opportunity to help find any remaining German citizens who were former Nazi SS guards. Given that his hunt for Nazis started almost 70 years after the Holocaust ended, many had died. He eventually located four former Nazi guards: Oskar Gröning, Reinhold Hanning, Hubert Zafke, and Ernst Tremmel. In April, Tremmel died just days before he was to go to trial at the age of 93, and Zafke's trial has been postponed indefinitely – he's been deemed unfit to stand trial due to his ill health. On 15 June 2015, Gröning, known as the "Bookkeeper of Auschwitz," became the 50th Nazi guard to be convicted since the war ended. The New York Times wrote, "Thomas Walther, a German lawyer who was the driving force behind the trial of Mr. Demjanjuk, represented Holocaust survivors as co-plaintiffs in the trials of Mr. Hanning and Mr. Gröning. He expressed frustration that Mr. Hanning never responded to his clients' pleas to recount his experience at Auschwitz so that present and future generations would know of it. But in a telephone interview on Thursday, Mr. Walther said that the clients he had contacted on hearing of Mr. Hanning's death insisted that the most important thing was that Mr. Hanning was brought to justice and that his deeds were recounted in court." 17 June 2016 Hanning was convicted for the crimes he committed at Auschwitz, and Walther helped bring the 51st Nazi guard to justice following the war. Hanning's trial has been dubbed by many as the "Last of the Nazi trials."

=== Gröning case ===
Gröning worked as an accountant at Auschwitz in Nazi-occupied Poland, sorting and counting the money taken from those killed or used as slave labour, and sending it back to his Nazi superiors in Berlin. The court in the northern city of Lüneburg acknowledged that he had only been a "cog in the wheel" at the camp but that it had taken thousands of such people to keep running "a machinery designed entirely for the killing" of human beings. Presiding judge Franz Kompisch called it "scandalous" that it had taken so long for the German justice system to prosecute such cases.

=== Schuetz case ===
Starting on 7 October 2021 Walther represented 17 co-plaintiffs suing Josef Schuetz, a concentration camp guard at the Sachsenhausen concentration camp. Walther secured the conviction, and Schuetz was sentenced to five years in prison on 28 June 2022. Schuetz was the oldest person to ever be convicted of Nazi war crimes.

== Legacy ==
Rafi Yablonsky of The Canadian Shaare Zedek Hospital Foundation said: "When we write these final chapters on the Holocaust, Thomas Walther, the last of the Nazi hunters, should not just be included–he should be recognized as a post-Holocaust member of the "Righteous Among the Nations."

At the 2017 March of the Living ceremony, Walther said, "Shalom. I have worked for quite a long time to change the law practice in Germany [regarding] accessory to murder in places just like Auschwitz… I did it for the survivors, I did it for the victims and I did it for the children of the victims. And I did it as well for the future… And the future is with me here, the young generation….They are my hope - they are also my future and your future, and your hope. To life!"
