= Haverbeck =

Haverbeck is a surname of German origin. Notable people with the surname include:

- H. D. S. Haverbeck (1913–1986), American philatelist and journalist
- Kurt Haverbeck (1899–1988), German field hockey player
- Werner Georg Haverbeck (1909–1999), German Nazi and folklorist
- Ursula Haverbeck (1928–2024), German neo-Nazi and holocaust denier
