= Max Eisen =

Slovak-Canadian author and holocaust survivor (1929–2022)

Max T. Eisen CM (15 March 1929 – 7 July 2022) was a Slovak-Canadian author, public speaker, and Holocaust educator. He travelled throughout Canada giving talks about his experiences as a concentration camp survivor, to students, teachers, universities, law enforcement personnel, and the community at large.

He had worked with the March of the Living, the Sarah and Chaim Neuberger Holocaust Education Centre, the Simon Wiesenthal Centre, and the Canadian Centre for Diversity.

With the encouragement of German lawyer Thomas Walther, Eisen testified in Germany at the trial of two former SS guards at Auschwitz: Reinhold Hanning (in 2016) and Oskar Gröning (2015). Both were convicted at their trials. He had been an active participant in March of the Living having made the journey back to Auschwitz-Birkenau, with thousands of students, 18 times.

== Early life ==
Eisen was born in Moldava nad Bodvou, Czechoslovakia, into an Orthodox Jewish family with two brothers and a baby sister. Along with his immediate family, Eisen lived with his uncle, aunt and paternal grandparents and was surrounded by a large extended family of some 60 members.

Eisen would live through a 13-day death march from Auschwitz to Loslau and there he was loaded onto metal boxcars made for transporting coal and sent to Mauthausen. Then from Melk he participated in a three-day march in the mountains to Ebensee. He was liberated on 6 May 1945. From Max's large extended family, only two cousins returned. Max arrived in Quebec City on 25 October 1949, and was sent to Toronto by the Canadian Jewish community. He married Ivy Cosman, with whom he had two children, two grandchildren and three great-grandchildren.

== Rescue ==
Eisen attributed his survival, in part, to the heroism of a member of the Polish resistance and to a US Army liberator. Dr. Tadeusz Orzeszko, the chief surgeon in the surgery department in Auschwitz, took pity on the 15 year old Eisen. He operated on him after a brutal beating by a Nazi guard and engaged him to be his assistant. Many years later, Eisen learned that Orzeszko was a member of the Polish resistance in Auschwitz. Sgt. Johnnie Steven, of the African American 761st Tank Battalion (United States) known as the Black Panthers, liberated Eisen on 6 May 1945.

Portions of Max Eisen's story appear in the film Come Out Fighting: The 761st (2002) directed by Fern Levitt and in Witness: Passing the Torch of Holocaust Memory to New Generations by author Eli Rubenstein who also wrote the Afterword for his memoir, By Chance Alone.

== By Chance Alone ==
Eisen had his memoirs published in a book titled By Chance Alone: A Remarkable True Story of Courage and Survival at Auschwitz, which was shortlisted for the RBC Taylor Prize in 2017.

The book won the 2019 edition of Canada Reads, where it was defended by Ziya Tong.

== Testimony at war crimes trial ==
With the encouragement of German lawyer Thomas Walther, Eisen testified at the trials of former Auschwitz guards Oskar Gröning (also known as the "bookkeeper" of Auschwitz) and Reinhold Hanning. Both were known to be members of the SS-Totenkopfverbände.
