= Ursula Haverbeck =

German neo-Nazi activist (1928–2024)

- Born: Ursula Hedwig Meta Wetzel; 8 November 1928; Winterscheid, Hesse-Nassau, Free State of Prussia, Weimar Germany
- Died: 20 November 2024 (aged 96); Vlotho, North Rhine-Westphalia, Germany
- Years active: 1963–2024
- Spouse: Werner Georg Haverbeck (m. 1970)
- Convictions: Holocaust denial Incitement to hatred
- Penalty: 4 years imprisonment

Ursula Hedwig Meta Haverbeck-Wetzel (née Wetzel; 8 November 1928 – 20 November 2024) was a German neo-Nazi activist. Between 2004 and her death in 2024, she had been the subject of multiple lawsuits and convictions for Holocaust denial, which is a criminal offense in Germany.

Her husband was Werner Georg Haverbeck, who was formerly a leader of the Nazi Party's German Labour Front and a direct subordinate of Rudolf Heß. He was the founder and director in 1933 of the German Imperial Federation of Nation and Homeland, as well as writer and publisher, historian, folklorist and parson of The Christian Community.

Haverbeck-Wetzel was engaged in Holocaust denial activism with her husband since the 1980s, but only came to prominence in the right-wing extremist scene in 1999, when she took over her late husband's ecofascist forum, Collegium Humanum, which she operated until the organisation's ban in 2008. She was repeatedly convicted for defamation and Volksverhetzung for denying the Holocaust in speeches and writings. Haverbeck initially received monetary fines, but in 2015, she was sentenced to her first prison term, after which she became known as a "Grande Dame" martyr figure within the neo-Nazi movement. Haverbeck was presumed to be the oldest Holocaust denier in Germany at the time of her death.

== Biography ==
Haverbeck-Wetzel was born in Winterscheid (today part of Gilserberg) and as an adolescent, she was a member of the Jungmädelbund, the female wing of the Hitler Youth for girls aged 10 to 13. After World War II, by her own account, she lived in Sweden for four years as a homeland displaced person (Heimatvertriebene) from East Prussia and studied pedagogy, philosophy and linguistics, including two years in Scotland. She married her long-time partner Werner Haverbeck, anthroposophic pastor and former SA and SS officer, on 31 July 1970.

For over fifty years, Haverbeck-Wetzel worked in the political shadow of her husband. After her husband's death in 1999, she took over many of his functions including chair of the international adult education establishment Heimvolkshochschule Collegium Humanum in Vlotho, which they both had founded in 1963. The Collegium Humanum was first active in the German environmental movement, and from the early 1980s openly turned to the right-wing extremism movement. In May 1981, as one of her first actions as an official board member, Haverbeck-Wetzel proclaimed her refusal to publicly distance the organisation from its sympathetic view of Adolf Hitler and the Nazi ideology.

From 1983 until 1989, Haverbeck-Wetzel was also president of the World Union for Protection of Life (Section Germany) non-governmental organisation, and during her tenure, she disclosed her opposition towards the Western system and the Allied occupation of the Federal Republic of Germany. She was temporarily a member of the Ecological Democratic Party (ÖDP). In 1989, at the instigation of the ÖDP regional associations Bremen and North Rhine-Westphalia, she was excluded from the party, amongst other reasons because she attempted to organize a right-wing coalition of the ÖDP, NPD, and other groups.

In 1992, Haverbeck-Wetzel became first chairperson of the newly founded Memorial Sites Association (German: Verein Gedächtnisstätte e.V.), remaining in that position until 2003. The registered association was established in May 1992 with the statute to build a dignified remembrance for the German civilian victims of World War II by bombing, abduction, expulsion and detention centres, to end "the unjustified unilateral nature of the view of history and struggle to overcome the [negatives of the] past" (German: um "die ungerechtfertigte Einseitigkeit der Geschichtsbetrachtung und Vergangenheitsbewältigung" zu beenden).

=== Right-wing extremism ===
Well before Germany's reunification in 1990, Haverbeck-Wetzel cultivated connections to neo-Nazi political groups like the NPD (National Democratic Party of Germany) with the aim of a major national collective movement in Germany. This orientation intensified in the years following. It was probably via this path that around 2000 she became acquainted with the neo-Nazi lawyer Horst Mahler. From this she became active as member and deputy director of the "Society for the Rehabilitation of Those Persecuted for Refutation of the Holocaust" (German Verein zur Rehabilitierung der wegen Bestreitens des Holocaust Verfolgten), which was founded in Vlotho on 9 November 2003, the anniversary of the Kristallnacht, and is chaired by the Swiss Holocaust denier Bernhard Schaub. Additionally, other Holocaust deniers, including Ernst Zündel (Canada), Robert Faurisson (France), Jürgen Graf (Switzerland), Gerd Honsik (Austria), Fredrick Töben (Australia), Germar Rudolf, Wilhelm Stäglich, Hans-Dietrich Sander, Manfred Roeder, Frank Rennicke and Anneliese Remer were also involved in its establishment. The organization was banned in May 2008 by the German Federal Ministry of the Interior (Bundesministerium des Innern) on the grounds of being hostile to the constitution of Germany.

=== Publication and other offenses ===
==== 2004–2014 ====
In June 2004, the district court of Bad Oeynhausen sentenced Haverbeck to a €5,400 fine (180 days at €30 each) for incitement to hatred and Holocaust denial. In the house journal of the Collegium Humanum, the Voice of Conscience (Stimme des Gewissens), she had introduced a form of denial of the Holocaust, together with the editor of the magazine, Ernst-Otto Cohrs. The two incriminated publication issues were subsequently confiscated by the German authorities. In a subsequent issue of the Voice of Conscience it was again claimed that the mass destruction of the Jews was "a myth". Packaged in a citation by the Russian newspaper Russkiy Vestnik (the Russian Messenger) who had published in Russia a special revisionist analysis issue of Jürgen Graf's work, with the special Russkiy Vestnik issue later cited favourably in Moscow's newspaper Pravda by Valentin Prussakov, it was alleged that the number of Jewish victims of National Socialism did not amount to six million, but to "only" about 500,000. On 10 March 2005, the court found a second case against Haverbeck-Wetzel and Cohrs. However, at the request of the Bielefeld Public Prosecutors Office the case was closed since "it was immaterial compared to another".

Another article by Haverbeck-Wetzel in the Voice of Conscience (November/December 2005) posited a thesis that Adolf Hitler was "just not to be understood from the believed Holocaust or his alleged war obsession, but only by a divine mission in the world-historical context". This triggered a renewed process for Holocaust denial, and in June 2007 another fine of 40 days at €30 each by the Dortmund Regional Court. Altogether, a total fine of €6,000 (200 days at €30 each) was formed. In 2008, Collegium Humanum was banned by the German Federal Ministry of the Interior (Bundesministerium des Innern) in 2008.

In June 2009, the District Court of Bad Oeynhausen found Haverbeck-Wetzel guilty of offending Charlotte Knobloch, president of the Central Council of Jews in Germany, who had earlier publicly advocated censorship of the Collegium Humanum Holocaust-deniers tools. According to a 1 July 2009 newspaper article in Mindener Tageblatt, Haverbeck-Wetzel wrote in her open letter response for the attention of Knobloch, among other things, Knobloch should not "interfere in German domestic affairs", if Knobloch does not like it in Germany, then she could "return to her origin in Inner Asia", and: "You do not have to live in Germany— in this evil land, where, as you say, six million of you were gassed." Her open letter also contained hostility such as "Prepare yourself for the day of truth [... it] is near and unstoppable", as well as "I warn you [... if] you continue as before, then a new pogrom could result, which would be horrific". Knobloch subsequently filed a criminal complaint, and Haverbeck-Wetzel was sentenced to a fine of €2,700.

==== 2014–2024 ====
In November 2014, Haverbeck-Wetzel lodged a police complaint against the Central Council of Jews in Germany. She accused the council of "persecution of innocent people". The investigation was abandoned in December 2014. The Bielefeld Public Prosecutors Office eventually examined proceedings against Haverbeck-Wetzel for false accusation.

In the ARD television broadcast series Panorama produced by NDR in March 2015, and despite proceedings prohibiting, Haverbeck-Wetzel again denied the mass destruction of the Jews and discussed her views. She described "this Holocaust" as "the biggest and most persistent lie in history". Haverbeck-Wetzel protested the trial of SS officer Oskar Gröning, the so-called "Accountant of Auschwitz", distributing leaflets featuring Holocaust denial outside the court and telling journalists that Gröning's admission of systematic killings in Auschwitz were false, insisting that the facility was instead a labour camp.

Haverbeck-Wetzel became the subject of a new investigation initiated in June 2015 by the Bielefeld Public Prosecutors Office, in connection with a publication in the journal The Voice of the Empire (Die Stimme des Reiches), prompting Haverbeck-Wetzel's home as well as that of three other accused persons to be searched by the State Criminal Police Office of Lower Saxony (Landeskriminalamt Niedersachsen) for evidence. In November, after being found guilty, she was sentenced to ten months in prison. In the Hamburg court, she insisted the status of Auschwitz as a place of death is "not historically proven" and is "only a belief". In an interview with neo-Nazi vlogger Nikolai Nerling in March 2018, Haverbeck further asserted that she there was no Holocaust as she claimed that the murders took place outside of Auschwitz concentration camp and that killings by gas chamber were limited to "maybe 356,000", calling this estimated death toll "negligible" compared to other mass killings during World War II.

In September 2016, Haverbeck-Wetzel was sentenced to ten months imprisonment for Holocaust denial, without the option for parole, but remained free until an appeal was heard concerning the earlier case. She had written to Detmold's mayor, Rainer Heller, the previous February, insisting that Auschwitz was no more than a labour camp, and that those who survived were only "alleged witnesses"; that was after the trial of former Auschwitz SS guard Reinhold Hanning.

In October 2016, she was sentenced to 11 months in Bad Oeynhausen for incitement to hate. In court again the next month, Haverbeck-Wetzel was sentenced in Verden to 2 1/2 more years in prison for Holocaust denial, after restating her claims in Voice of the Reich (Stimme des Reiches). Her attorney appealed the verdict, arguing it violated Haverbeck's right to free speech. In February 2017, she was sentenced in Detmold to ten months for incitement to hatred and slandering the memory of the deceased (Verunglimpfung des Andenkens Verstorbener), after she shared Holocaust denial brochures after her September 2016 trial. An appeal led to an increased sentence of fourteen months. In October 2017, Berlin-Tiergarten court separately sentenced Haverbeck to six months imprisonment.

Haverbeck served a 2 1/2 year sentence at JVA Bielefeld-Senne, beginning May 2018, after authorities were required to fetch Haverbeck due to her failure to show up to JVA Bielefeld-Brackwede. When questioned about her statements during the Nerling interview in 2018, Haverbeck claimed that she was "just asking questions" and stated that she could not tell if the Holocaust happened because she had not "witnessed any crime" herself. She was released in November 2020. The state court of Bielefeld and the higher regional court of Hamm denied her constitutional complaint which argued that Holocaust denial was protected under free speech.

In February 2022, Haverbeck again stood trial for incitement to hatred the state court of Berlin, receiving a 1-year sentence. She appealed her 2017 Berlin-Tiergarten sentences in April 2022 and unsuccessfully sought a reduction to probation. On 26 June 2024, she was convicted by the court of Hamburg, being a continuation of her 2015 trial, and sentenced to an additional 16 months at JVA Bielefeld-Senne. Neither sentence was ever enforced due to an investigation into suspended sentencing due to health concerns, despite her getting registered at a prison hospital facility. Haverbeck died on 20 November 2024, at the age of 96.

== Publications ==
=== Non-fiction ===
- Werner G. Haverbeck: Der Weltkampf um den Menschen. Eine deutsche Selbstbesinnung (The world struggle for the man. A German self-reflection), Grabert Verlag, Tuebingen 1995, ISBN 9783878471516
- Werner G. Haverbeck: Der Weltkampf um die Gemeinschaft. Die Entwicklung der Demokratie zur Volksordnung (The world struggle for the community. The development of democracy into a people's order), Grabert Verlag, Tübingen 1996, ISBN 9783878471547
- with Erhard Eppler, Max Guede (eds.), Walter Hähnle (pub.): Bekommen wir eine andere Republik? (Do we get a different republic?), Gustav Heinemann-Initiative, Radius-Verlag GmbH, Stuttgart 1982, ISBN 9783871735363
- with Martin Black, Claudio Mutti, Wolfgang Schüler, Oliver Ritter (eds.): Religion und Tradition (Religion and Tradition), Verlag Zeitenwende, Dresden 2002, ISBN 9783934291157
