= World Union for Protection of Life =

Organization founded by Günther Schwab

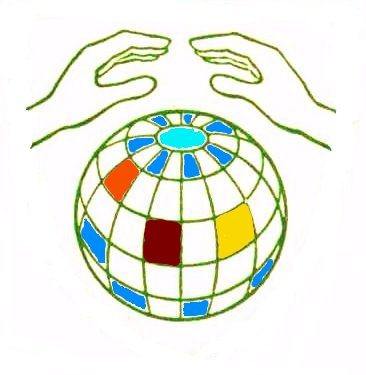
Logo of the international organization since 2014

The World Union for Protection of Life (German: Weltbund zum Schutz des Lebens, French: Union Mondiale pour la Protection de la Vie, Russian: Всемирный союз для защиты жизни) is an international non-profit organization and non-governmental organization which was founded 1958 in Salzburg (Austria) by the writer Günther Schwab. The concept Protection of Life is considered to be different from the protection of the environment as it has been used by the United Nations Environmental Program (UNEP), though that organization was founded as a result of the United Nations Conference on the Human Environment in 1972.

Günther Schwab is known as the author of the screenplay for the movie The Forester of the Silver Wood (1954). In his novel Der Tanz mit dem Teufel (Dance with the Devil) Günther Schwab gives his expressions to sentiments for nature protection and describes the destruction of nature as a plan of a devil who seems really existent. The book was translated in many languages, the first English translation was published 1963. In the year 1958 Schwab started to set up an organization with the name World Union for Saving of Life which was registered as World Union for Protection of Life two years later and soon activated branches in more than 30 countries all over the world.

== Germany ==
International congresses with scientist and church organizations mainly took place in German speaking countries. Around the year 1968 the organization had several thousand members in the Federal Republic of Germany. Famous members were the physicist Karl Bechert and the chemist Hans-Adalbert Schweigart.

The organization played an active role during the foundation of the German Green Party, especially in Lower Saxony.

Several leading members were previously members of the Nazi party, like Werner Georg Haverbeck, president 1974–1982, and his wife Ursula Haverbeck, who has been the subject of lawsuits due to her Holocaust denial. The German branch (Collegium Humanum) was banned by the Federal Minister of the Interior under section 3 of the Association Act in 2008.

== Austria ==
The organization was officially registered as World Union for Saving of Life on 24 September 1958 in Salzburg and is therefore one of the oldest anti-nuclear organization. One of the famous members was the biologist Annie Francé-Harrar. The Austrian anti-nuclear power activist Robert Jungk committed himself to the WUPL. According to the Austrian Ministry of the Interior, the national section was dissolved on 31 December 2012.

== International activities ==
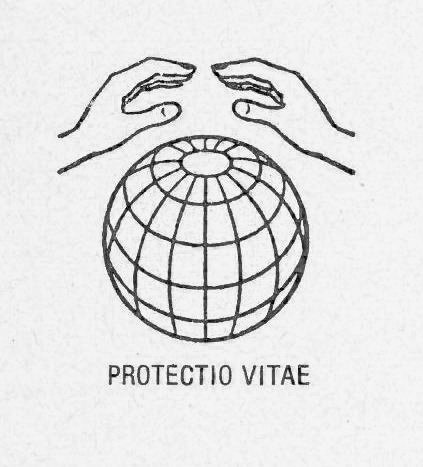
Old Logo of the international organization

According to its own publications the WUPL had sections in Australia, Egypt, Ethiopia, Belgium, Brazil, Bulgaria, Canada, Czechoslovakia, Finland, France, Germany, Great Britain, Hungary, India, Ireland, Israel, Italy, Japan, Luxembourg, Mexico, Netherlands, Norway, Poland, Romania, Sweden, Switzerland, Spain, South-Korea, South-Africa, Yugoslavia and USA.

A scientific advisory board of 400 scientists out of 53 countries supported the work of the organization. Among them were 40 Nobel laureates. President of the board was Linus Pauling. Günther Schwab himself held about 1500 public readings.

In Australia the WUPL tried to ward off the dangers connected with the building of the Atomic Reactor at Jervis Bay, only about 130 miles from Sydney. Its efforts, and a refusal by the local trade union peak body to provide workers, helped convince the Australian government to cancel the project.

The World Union for Protection of Life gave the Hans-Adalbert-Schweigart-Medal to:

- 1979: André Gernez and Konrad Lorenz
- 1981: Peter Weish
- 1982: Werner Georg Haverbeck
- 1983: Rosalie Bertell
- 1986: Franz Weber
- ????: Ralph Graeub

The seat of the international organization changed over the course of time, for example from Hannover to Bad Reichenhall. After the death of Günther Schwab in 2006 there was a restructuring.

In 2008 – 50 years after foundation – the organization pledged for the Global Population Speak Out (GPSO). Since 2009 the international stage was activated by scientists in 13 countries. For many organizations with similar goals has been set up since the 1970er, today the WUPL is only open for elected representatives of organizations with equal goals and members with a scientific qualification. In October 2009 the German text of the foundation document was published in the internet. International Members took part in the United Nations Climate Change Conference 2009.

== Bibliography ==
- Radkau, Joachim. Nature and Power. A Global History of the Environment. Cambridge University Press 2008.
- Schwab, Günther. Dance with the devil. A dramatic encounter. Geoffrey Bles, London 1963.
