= Hubert Zafke =

Nazi medic (1920–2018)

- Born: 26 September 1920
- Died: 5 July 2018 (aged 97)
- Occupation: Nazi medic

Hubert Zafke (26 September 1920 – 5 July 2018) was a Nazi S.S. medic who served in several concentration camps during the second world war. After serving four years in prison following the war, Zafke settled in Gnevkow, Germany where he married and raised four sons and worked in an agricultural company. However, 71 years after the end of the war, following preliminary investigations by the central office for the investigation of Nazi crimes, Zafke stood trial for 3861 counts of accessory to murder. After a lengthy trial delayed multiple times by Zafke's failing health, the trial was dropped, as Zafke was found to be unfit for trial.

== Early life ==
Ernst Hubert Zafke was born on 26 September 1920 in Pomerania (in Modern-day Poland) to a farming family. He grew up on his parents’ farm, attended elementary school and joined an agricultural college. He joined the Hitler Youth in 1933 at age 13 and six years later, at the age of 19, the Waffen SS.

== World War 2 and post-war ==
From 1940 to 1944, Zafke served as a paramedic with the SS. He trained at a medical school which belonged to the Dachau concentration camp facility. From 1942 to 1943, Zafke served at the Neuengamme concentration camp, where he worked as a medic. There, he was promoted to Unterscharführer (junior squad leader). From 15 August to 14 September 1944, Zafke served at the Auschwitz-Birkenau concentration camp in Poland. During this period, 14 deportation trains arrived at Auschwitz (one carrying famous diarist Anne Frank), and thousands of Jews were murdered in Auschwitz's gas chambers. On 26 September, Zafke left along with 400 Jewish women to Neustadt concentration camp. Zafke had left prior to the liberation of the camp by Soviet forces. After the war ended in 1945, Zafke was arrested by British troops stationed in West Germany and handed over to the Polish government. As he was a member of the SS, he was sentenced on 10 March 1948 by the Kraków district court to 4 years in prison. After being released from prison in 1952, Zafke settled in Gnevkow, a small village in northeastern Germany. He married and had four sons. Working in a company specializing in agricultural products and pesticides, he lived a normal life in Germany. Although he was questioned by the authorities several times, his identity was never questioned and he lived a normal life in occupied Germany.

== Retrial ==
Following the fall of the Berlin wall and the reunification of Germany, many archived records were made accessible to the public. Thus, Zafke and many other former Nazis came onto the radar of Nazi hunters. In 2013, German federal prosecutors began another investigation into Nazi members who had served in concentration camps, such as Zafke. In 2016, Zafke was arrested and charged with 3,861 counts of accessory to murder. The charges were focused only on the time he served at Auschwitz-Birkenau, from 15 August to 14 September 1944. For the first time, official evidence and eyewitnesses were not necessary, as official records had already proven that Zafke had indeed served at Auschwitz and that was enough evidence to prove Zafke knew about the murders. Zafke was scheduled to stand trial in February 2016; however, this was overturned by the Judge who decided that Zafke's various medical issues made him unfit for trial. This order was again overturned by the Court of Appeals, stating that Zafke was indeed physically able to stand trial.

The main highlight of the trial was that as Zafke had served at Auschwitz and knew about the murders that were continuously occurring in the facility's gas chambers. Several previous trials had been conducted previously in this fashion, including the trials of John Demjanjuk in 2011, Reinhold Hanning in 2016 and the trial of Oskar Gröning in 2015. However, Zafke's lawyers argued that Zafke, who suffered from dementia and depression due to late-stage Alzheimer's disease, was unfit for trial. After numerous delays caused by Zafke's failing health, the trial was set for 16 October 2016. However, this was further delayed due to Zafke's health. In June 2017, three judges responsible for repeatedly delaying the trial due to Zafke's failing health were removed after multiple complaints of bias. However, after two examinations in March and July 2017, the case was dropped as Zafke was deemed unfit for trial. According to the BBC, a court spokesperson stated that "the defendant is no longer able to reasonably assess his interests".

== Death ==
He died on 5 July 2018 at the age of 97.
