= Peter Weish =

Peter Weish (* 29 November 1936 in Vienna) is an Austrian scientist (biology, chemistry and physics), author and environmental activist.

Peter Weish studied biology, chemistry and physics at the University of Vienna. After receiving his doctorate of philosophy in 1966 he worked at the Institute for Nuclear Radiation Protection Centre Seibersdorf until 1970.

In 1969 he began a critical engagement with the health and societal aspects of nuclear energy. From 1974 he worked as a research officer at the Institute of Environmental Sciences and Conservation.

1984 he became a lecturer in Human Ecology at the University of Agricultural Sciences, Vienna.

In addition to his commitment to the nuclear industry (both in Austria and abroad) he dealt with questions from the environmental protection, environmental education, conservation and development cooperation. As part of his engagement for the environment, Dr. Peter Weish is working in numerous organizations and committees, for example:

- Forum for Nuclear Affairs (advisory body to the Ministry responsible for nuclear matters)
- World Wide Fund for Nature

== Decorations and awards ==
- Hans Adalbert Schweigart medal of the World Union for Protection of Life
- Eduard Paul Tratz Gold Medal of the Austrian Federal Nature Conservation
- Konrad Lorenz National Award for Environmental Protection
- 2012: Austrian Cross of Honour for Science and Art, 1st class
- 2006: Gold Medal of the Province of Vienna
