= Günther Schwab =

Austrian writer and author

- Born: Günther Schwab; 7 October 1904; Prague, Austrian Empire (now in Czech Republic)
- Died: 12 April 2006 (aged 101); Salzburg, Austria
- Occupation: Author
- Writing career
- Notable awards: Austrian Cross of Honour First Class for Science and Art (2004); Salzburg Cup of Honour (2004)
- Literary movement: environment

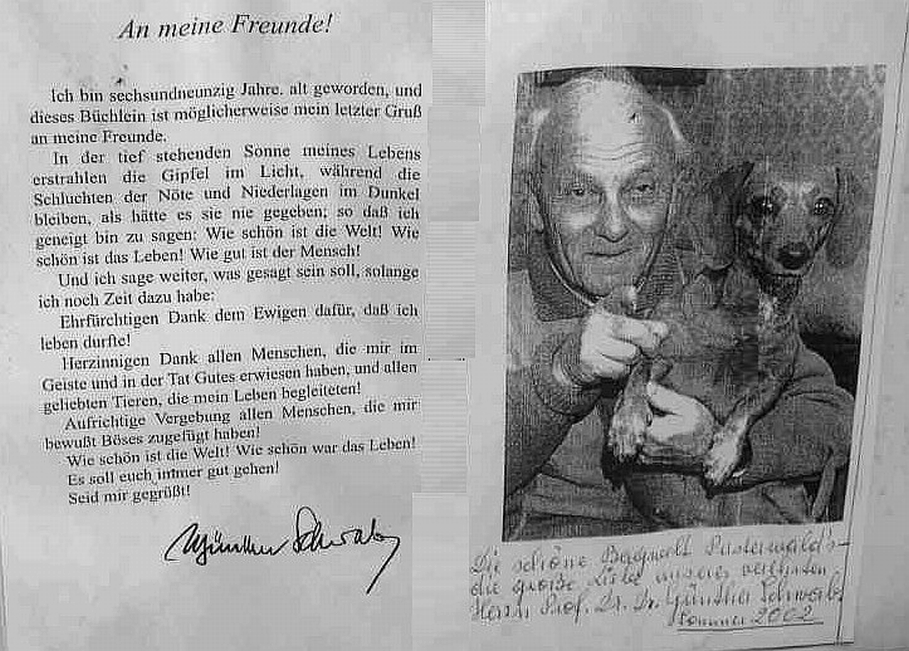
Schwab Guenther Tanzstattkapelle

Günther Schwab (7 October 1904 in Prague – 12 April 2006 in Salzburg, Austria) was an Austrian writer and author, and member of the Nazi party. He founded the World Union for Protection of Life.

== Early life ==
After the First World War his family, who were merchants, moved to Vienna, Austria, where Schwab discovered his love for nature. In Vienna, he joined NSDAP (Nazi Party) as well as Sturmabteilung (SA or Brownshirts) in which he was a lieutenant from 1930.

Through Prof. Dr. Günther Schlesinger, an Austrian Nature Protection Referent, Günther Schwab got more involved with nature protection. He studied in those years, as expected of the family, at the commercial academy, but due to his love for nature he soon became a forest ranger.

During his life, he would serve on the advisory panel of the Society for Biological Anthropology, Eugenics, and Behavior Research.

== Environment and literature ==
His first book Abenteuer am Fluss (Adventures At The River), published by Franz-Eher-Verlag, the Central publishing house of the Nazi party, was proof of his love. as were all his following books Der Wind über den Feldern (The wind across the fields), Kamerad mit dem haarigen Gesicht (A story about a dog), Land voller Grande (Land of grace), Das Glück am Rand (Fortune at the edge).

In 1951, he gave up his profession, moved to Salzburg and dedicated his life to writing. He realised that the new upcoming 1950s affluent society threatened to destroy all that he loved: the countryside with all its inhabitants, the solitude of the wilderness, the wildlife as he knew it up to then. Günther Schwab proved to be almost clairvoyant when, at the age of 50, he held a lecture with the title "The catastrophe has started already", at the Audi Max in Vienna in 1954.

=== The Dance with the Devil ===
To explain his fears more plainly and understandably for the man in the street, Günther Schwab wrote his book Der Tanz mit dem Teufel (The dance with the devil). It reads like a subtle, interesting detective story, which he finished in 1958. The theme was mankind's industrial sins causing environmental damage in condemning many Americans as degenerates. The book prophesied that improperly-managed population sizes from other continents would avalanche Europe. This was an effort to renew Social Darwinism and eugenics theories. The English translation was published in 1963.

== Film ==
- The Forester of the Silver Wood (1954)

== Awards ==
Günther Schwab reached 100 years of age in 2004 when he received the Cup of Honour of Salzburg and the Austrian Cross of Honour for Science and Art, 1st class. He died on 12 April 2006.

== Selected Literature ==
- Schwab, Günther. Dance with the devil. A dramatic encounter. Geoffrey Bles, London 1963.
