= Josef Schütz =

Nazi concentration camp guard (1920–2023)

- Born: 16 November 1920; Marijampolė, Lithuania
- Died: 11 April 2023 (aged 102); Brandenburg an der Havel, Germany
- Other name: Josef S. (in German press)
- Military career
- Allegiance: Nazi Germany
- Branch: Waffen-SS
- Rank: Rottenführer
- Known for: Sachsenhausen concentration camp guard

Josef Schütz (16 November 1920 – 11 April 2023), known in the German press as Josef S., was a Lithuanian-born German Nazi concentration camp guard who was stationed at the Sachsenhausen concentration camp. In June 2022, at the age of 101, Schütz was handed a five-year sentence after a criminal trial for complicity in war crimes during the Holocaust during World War II, becoming the oldest person tried and convicted for Nazi war crimes in Germany.

== Biography ==
Josef Schütz was born in Lithuania on 16 November 1920. By 1942, he was working in the Sachsenhausen concentration camp where one of his duties was being stationed in the watchtower. During Schütz's tenure at the camp, there were three camp commandants under whom Schütz worked: Hans Loritz (1942), Albert Sauer (1942–1943), and Anton Kaindl (1943–1945). Schütz remained at the camp until the end of the war in 1945. After the war, he was released as a prisoner of war in 1947, after which he moved to East Germany where he worked as a locksmith. He was at one point married, but in 1986 became a widower. By 2021, he lived in the northeast state of Brandenburg, Germany.

== Trial, conviction and death ==
The trial opened on 7 October 2021, when Schütz was 100, in the Neuruppin Regional Court in Brandenburg, during which he was charged with 3,518 counts of being an accessory to murder. The 17 co-plaintiffs were represented by Thomas Walther, who had previously won a conviction against former Ukrainian-American Waffen-SS guard John Demjanjuk a decade earlier in 2011. Schütz was represented by Stefan Waterkamp. While Schütz has been identified internationally, during and after the trial he is known in Germany only by his first name and last initial due to that country's privacy laws. He pleaded not guilty.

During the trial, Schütz stated he did "absolutely nothing" wrong and was not aware of the atrocities happening at Sachsenhausen. Instead, he stated he worked as a "farm laborer near Pasewalk in northeastern Germany during the period in question", a claim which the court rejected. The court used historical documents to prove he worked at the camp and was a non-commissioned officer in the Waffen-SS. Testimonies of survivors were also heard, including from Leon Schwarzbaum, who showed a picture of his family who had died in the camp. Schütz was sentenced to five years in prison for the crimes; when he arrived in court in a wheelchair to hear the verdict on 28 June 2022, he hid his face from the press with a folder to avoid being recognized. During the verdict reading, Judge Udo Lechtermann stated, "You willingly supported this mass extermination with your activity." The timeframe for appeal would have been within one week of the verdict.

Afterwards, Schütz lodged an appeal with the Federal Court of Justice, claiming a violation of substantive law. This initiated a deadline of September 27, 2022, for the drafting of the written judgment. The case files were received by the Federal Court on February 13, 2023. However, Schütz died on April 11, 2023 at the age of 102, before a ruling on the appeal was issued. Consequently, the Federal Court of Justice discontinued the proceedings on May 3, 2023, and the original judgment was rendered null and void.
