= Susan Pollack =

British Holocaust survivor

- Born: Zsuzsanna Blau; 9 September 1930 (age 96); Felsögöd, Hungary
- Known for: Holocaust survivor
- Spouse: Abraham Pollack
- Awards: MBE, OBE

Susan Pollack OBE (born 9 September 1930) is a Hungarian-born British Holocaust survivor and Holocaust educational speaker. During the Holocaust, she was interned at Auschwitz-Birkenau for 10 weeks before being sent to Guben in Germany to work in an armaments factory, and later, by death march, to Bergen-Belsen concentration camp where she was liberated by the British Army on 15 April 1945.

== Early life ==
Pollack was born Zsuzsanna Blau on 9 September 1930 in Felsögöd, Hungary into a Jewish family. Her father, Erno Blau, ran a business selling wood and coal. There were 16 Jewish families living in the small village, which had a population of c. 3000. At an early age she noticed a rise in antisemitism in her town, including laws introduced from 1938. Her brother Laszlo (Laci) was restricted from attending further education due to a law limiting the number of Jewish students attending to two per cent. With the onset of World War II in September 1939, antisemitism became widespread, including radio propaganda and physical attacks. Laci was beaten at a scout meeting. After the Nazis invaded Hungary in March 1944, Jews were made to wear a yellow badge. Her family had their citizenship revoked and her father was forced to close his business. He was invited to a meeting but was instead taken to a concentration camp on a lorry. Pollack never discovered where he died. In May 1944, Pollack and her family were ordered to leave their home and were transported to a ghetto in Vác followed by an internment camp. Later that month, they were sent by cattle truck to Auschwitz-Birkenau.

== Auschwitz-Birkenau ==
Pollack was aged 13 when she and the rest of her family were loaded onto the cattle truck. She recalled that they were locked into the dark, cold space with little room to sit down in inhuman conditions for days with many others. When she arrived at the railway platform at Auschwitz a prisoner told her to say that she was 15 to save her life. She was immediately separated from her mother (Gisella), who was taken with other women and children to the gas chamber. After being separated from her family, Pollack, alongside hundreds of other young women and girls, were stripped and had their heads shaved. She was not tattooed with a number because she was being held with hundreds of others to be deported to other sites. She shared a barracks with 800 young women and each day was forced to parade naked with the other women in front of Josef Mengele, who selected some of them for experiments. Pollack remained in the camp for ten weeks, working as a slave labourer with limited food. She was then transported to Guben, Germany to work in an armaments factory.

== Bergen-Belsen ==
Pollack was forced along with other prisoners on a death march to Bergen-Belsen concentration camp by the Nazis. Many of the prisoners were shot or died of starvation. She described the conditions as "treacherous". On the long walk, they sometimes slept in a barn and were fed with boiled potatoes, until they eventually arrived at Bergen-Belsen. She described the camp as "indescribable", commenting that there were "mountains of corpses everywhere and no hygiene". Infectious diseases were widespread in the camp.

On 15 April 1945, they were liberated by the British Army. When she heard shouting in the camp that they were being set free, she crawled out of her barracks. An English soldier picked her up and put her in an ambulance, which transported her to a makeshift hospital. Pollack did not feel exuberant about being liberated from the camp. She stated that the dehumanisation and despair left her feeling numb. She was treated for various diseases including tuberculosis and typhoid, then moved to Sweden to recover. Pollack's brother Laci was the only other family member to survive and he returned to the family home in Hungary. Pollack learned that her brother had been forced to work as a Sonderkommando, and consequently he experienced mental health issues.

== Later life ==
Pollack moved to Canada, where she met her husband, who was also a survivor of the Holocaust. In 1962, she moved to the United Kingdom, where she studied a history degree, worked as a librarian, volunteered as a Samaritan and spent 25 years teaching about the Holocaust. She made it her mission to share her Holocaust testimony. She has shared her life story with thousands of young people and adults.

In May 2015, Pollack gave evidence at the trial of former Auschwitz SS guard Oskar Gröning.

== Honours ==
In the 2016 New Year Honours, she was appointed MBE for services to Holocaust Education, and in the 2023 New Year Honours, she was appointed OBE for services to Holocaust Education and Awareness.

== Other media ==
In January 2022, the premiere of Pollack's life story was portrayed on stage in a play titled "Kindness", by the theatre company Voices of the Holocaust. Since its premiere, ‘Kindness: A Legacy of the Holocaust’ co-authored by Mark Wheeller has been seen by over 30,000 students in schools across the UK.
