= Collegium Humanum =

German ecofascist organisation

The Collegium Humanum was an ecofascist organisation in Germany from 1963 to 2008. It was established in 1963 as a club, was first active in the German environmental movement, then from the early 1980s became a far-right political organisation and was banned in 2008 by the Federal Minister of the Interior Wolfgang Schäuble due to "continued denial of the Holocaust".

== History ==
The Collegium Humanum was founded in 1963 by Werner Georg Haverbeck, a former Nazi, as a "community college (Heimvolkshochschule) for the environment and protection of life" in Vlotho. The Collegium Humanum was registered as a non-profit association in Bad Oeynhausen (entry date: December 10, 1968).

From 1972 the Collegium was a member of the German section of the World Union for Protection of Life. In the run-up to the 1979 European elections, preparatory talks were held in the Collegium Humanum to establish the Sonstige Politische Vereinigung Die Grünen (SPV), in which conservative and middle-class environmental initiatives were organized. At the same time, the "Ecological Manifesto" of the National Democratic Party of Germany was being drawn up there.

== Funding ==
The Collegium Humanum was financed through seminar fees and donations.

== Prohibition ==
According to critical statements by the President of the Zentralrat der Juden in Deutschland (Central Council of Jews in Germany), Charlotte Knobloch, she was threatened on 30 January 2008 in a letter from the chairman of the association and subsequently filed a complaint.

On 7 May 2008, the Collegium Humanum, including the affiliated association "Bauernhilfe e. V.", was banned by the Federal Minister of the Interior under section 3 of the Association Act, as "against the constitutional order of the Federal Republic of Germany (judges) and (...) continued by (...) denial of the Holocaust against valid right." In connection with the banning of the organisation, house searches were carried out at several locations in Germany.
