= Hans-Adalbert Schweigart =

German chemist (1900–1972)

Hans Adalbert Schweigart (July 7, 1900 in Biberberg – December 12, 1972 in Hannover) was a German chemist and researcher in nutrition. He studied chemistry in Berlin and Munich. In 1935 he created the general term vital substances. He was director of the Institute for Care and storage of agricultural trade research at the Friedrich-Wilhelm University in Berlin. During World War II he observed among the German soldiers of the Africacorps under General Rommel that pork meat in the nutrition in a hot climate caused negative effects. Later he found out that cancerous tissue is always deficient in oxygen.

His scientific masterpiece "The nutrition budget of the German people" (original: Der Ernährungshaushalt des deutschen Volkes) took him into disrepute after 1945 but even later in connection with the refurbishment of the Nazi past, because the preface of the book was written in 1937 stained strongly in favor of the government politically. This also had a negative impact on the organizations in which he was involved.

Schweigart was the first president of the international non-governmental organization World Union for Protection of Life in Luxembourg 1964 and organized the International Congresses about Vital Substances and Civilization Diseases.

== Publications ==
- Der Ernährungshaushalt des deutschen Volkes. Deutscher Verlag für Politik und Wirtschaft, Berlin 1937.
- Nutritional problems. Hippokrates. 1957;28(9) PMID 13438448
- Vitalstoffe Ziv. 12: 48.
- Vitalstoff-Lehre, Vitalstoff-Tabellarium. Zauner 1962.
