= Oskar Gröning =

Accountant in Auschwitz (1921–2018)

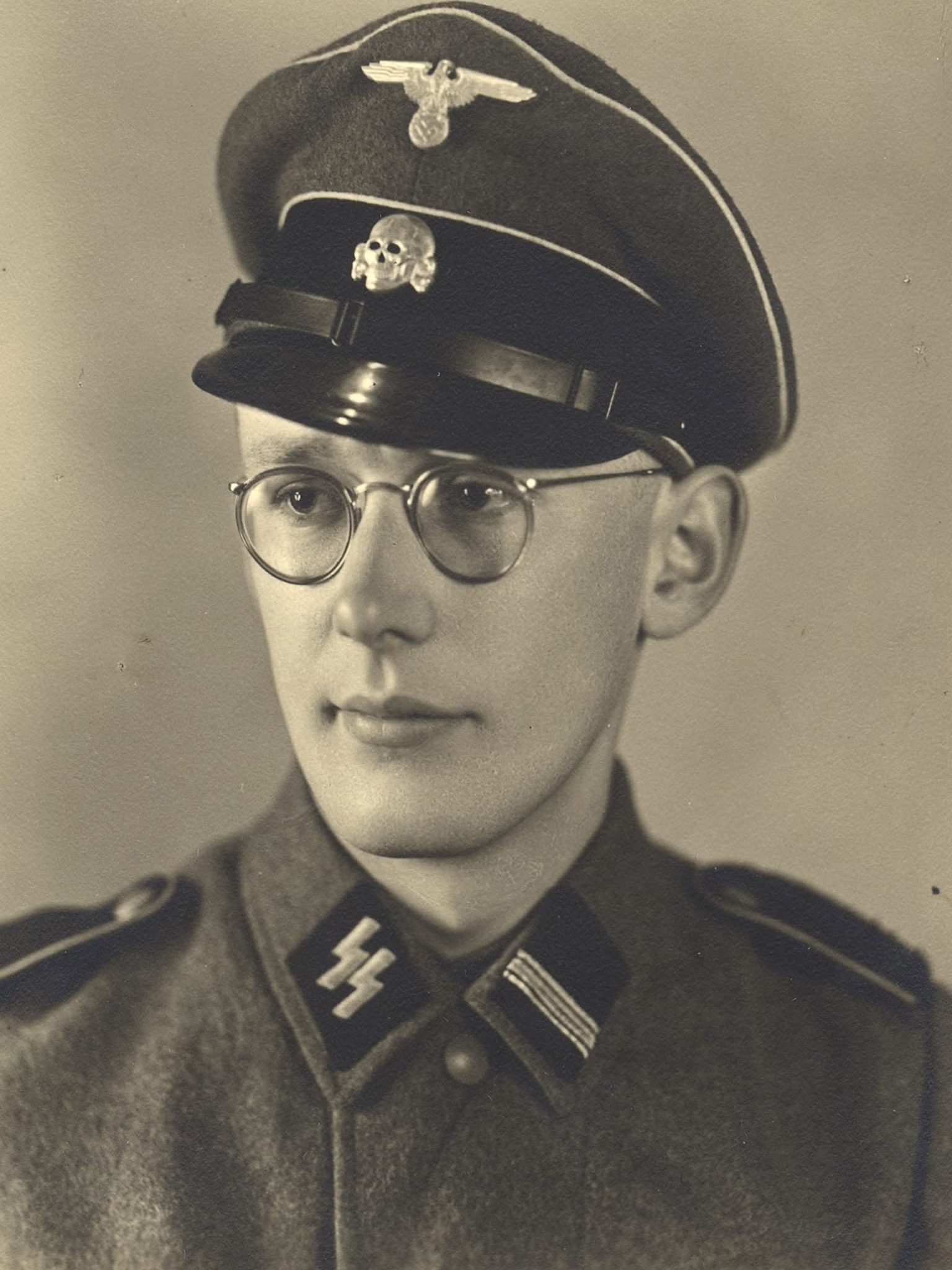
- Gröning in 1940
- Born: 10 June 1921; Nienburg, Hanover, Prussia, Germany
- Died: 9 March 2018 (aged 96); Lower Saxony, Germany
- Other name: Oscar Groening (in English)
- Known for: SS soldier at Auschwitz concentration camp, denunciation of Holocaust denial
- Status: Deceased
- Convictions: 300,000+ counts of Accessory to murder
- Penalty: 4 years imprisonment
- Military career
- Allegiance: Nazi Germany
- Branch: Waffen-SS
- Service years: 1940–1945
- Rank: SS-Unterscharführer
- Conflicts: Second World War: Battle of the Bulge (WIA); Western Allied invasion of Germany (POW)

Oskar Gröning (10 June 1921 – 9 March 2018) was a German SS Unterscharführer who was stationed at the Auschwitz concentration camp. His responsibilities included counting and sorting the money taken from prisoners, and he was in charge of the personal property of arriving prisoners. On a few occasions he witnessed the procedures of mass killing in the camp. After being transferred from Auschwitz to a combat unit in October 1944, Gröning surrendered to the British at the end of the war; his role in the SS was not discovered. He was eventually transferred to the UK as a prisoner of war and worked as a farm labourer.

Upon his return to Germany, he led a normal life, reluctant to talk about his time in Auschwitz. However, more than 40 years later, after learning about Holocaust denial, he decided to make public his activities at Auschwitz. He openly criticised those who denied the events that he had witnessed and the ideology to which he had subscribed. Gröning was notable as a German willing to make public statements about his experience as an SS soldier, which were self-incriminating and which exposed his life to public scrutiny. In particular, he confessed to stealing jewellery and money from gas chamber victims for his personal benefit.

In September 2014, Gröning was charged by German prosecutors as an accessory to murder in 300,000 cases, for his role at the Auschwitz concentration camp. His trial began in April 2015, after the court had ruled that, at the age of 93, he was still fit to stand trial. The trial was held in Lüneburg, Germany. On 15 July 2015, he was found guilty of knowingly facilitating mass murder and sentenced to four years' imprisonment. Following a number of unsuccessful appeals against the prison sentence, Gröning died on 9 March 2018 while hospitalized before he was set to begin his sentence.

== Early life and education ==
Gröning was born in June 1921, in Nienburg in what was then Prussia (today in Lower Saxony), the son of a skilled textile worker. His mother died when he was four. His father, a nationalist and strict conservative, joined Der Stahlhelm – a revanchist ultranationalist ex-serviceman's association – after Germany's defeat in the First World War (during which his father had lost an eye), and his father's anger at how Germany had been treated following the Treaty of Versailles increased as his textile business went bankrupt in 1929 due to insufficient capital.

Gröning stated that his childhood had been one of "discipline, obedience and authority". Gröning was fascinated by military uniforms, and one of his earliest memories was of looking at photos of his grandfather, who served in an elite regiment of the Duchy of Brunswick, on his horse and playing his trumpet. He told Der Spiegel in 2005, that as a child, he played marbles in the street with Anne Selig, the daughter of a Jewish ironmonger whose store was next to his home. When Nazi stormtroopers held up a sign outside the shop saying, "Germans, do not buy from Jews," he said, he was unmoved. As a boy in the 1930s, he first joined Scharnhorst (the youth wing of his father's organisation, Der Stahlhelm), and later the Hitler Youth when the Nazis came to power in 1933. Influenced by his family's values, he felt that Nazism was advantageous to Germany and believed that the Nazis "were the people who wanted the best for Germany and who did something about it." He participated in the burning of books written by Jews and other authors that the Nazis considered degenerate in the belief that he was helping Germany free itself from an alien culture, and considered that National Socialism was having a positive effect on the economy, pointing to lower unemployment.

Gröning left school with high marks and began a traineeship as a bank clerk when he was 17, but war was declared in 1939 shortly after he started employment, and eight of the twenty clerks present were immediately conscripted into the army. This allowed the remaining trainees to further their banking careers in a relatively short time; however, despite these opportunities, Gröning and his colleagues were inspired by Germany's quick victories in France and Poland and wanted to contribute.

== SS career ==
Gröning wanted to join an elite army unit and set his sights on joining the Schutzstaffel. Without his father's knowledge, he did so in 1940 at a hotel where the SS was recruiting. Gröning said that his father was disappointed to learn this when he came home after having joined.

Gröning described himself as a "desk person" and was content with his role in SS salary administration, which granted him both the administrative and military aspects he wanted from a career.

=== Auschwitz ===
==== Arrival ====
Gröning worked as a bookkeeper for a year until 1942, when the SS ordered that desk jobs were to be reserved for injured veterans, and that fit members in administrative roles were to be subjected to more challenging duties. Gröning and about 22 of his colleagues travelled to Berlin where they reported to one of the SS economic offices.

They were then given a lecture by several high-ranking officers who reminded them of the oath of loyalty they took, which they could prove by doing a difficult task. The task was top secret: Gröning and his fellow SS men had to sign a declaration that they would not disclose it to family or friends, or people not in their unit. Once this had concluded, they were split into smaller groups and taken to various Berlin stations where they boarded a train in the direction of Katowice with orders to report to the commandant of Auschwitz, a place Gröning had not heard of before.

Upon arrival at the main camp, they were given provisional bunks in the SS barracks, warmly greeted by fellow SS men and provided with food. Gröning was surprised at the myriad food items available in addition to basic SS rations. The new arrivals were curious about what function Auschwitz served. They were told that they should find out for themselves because Auschwitz was a special kind of concentration camp. Immediately someone opened the door and shouted "Transport!", causing three or four people to leave the room.

The next day, Gröning and the other arrivals reported to the central SS administrative building and were asked about their background before the war. One of the officers said Gröning's bank clerk skills would be useful, and took him to barracks where the prisoners' money was kept. Gröning was told that when prisoners were registered into the camp, their money was stored here and later returned to them when they left.

It became clear that Auschwitz was not a normal internment camp with above-average SS rations, but that it served an additional function. Gröning was informed that money taken from interned Jews was not actually returned to them. When he inquired further, his colleagues confirmed that the Jews were being systematically exterminated and that this had included the transport of prisoners who had arrived the previous night.

==== Tasks ====
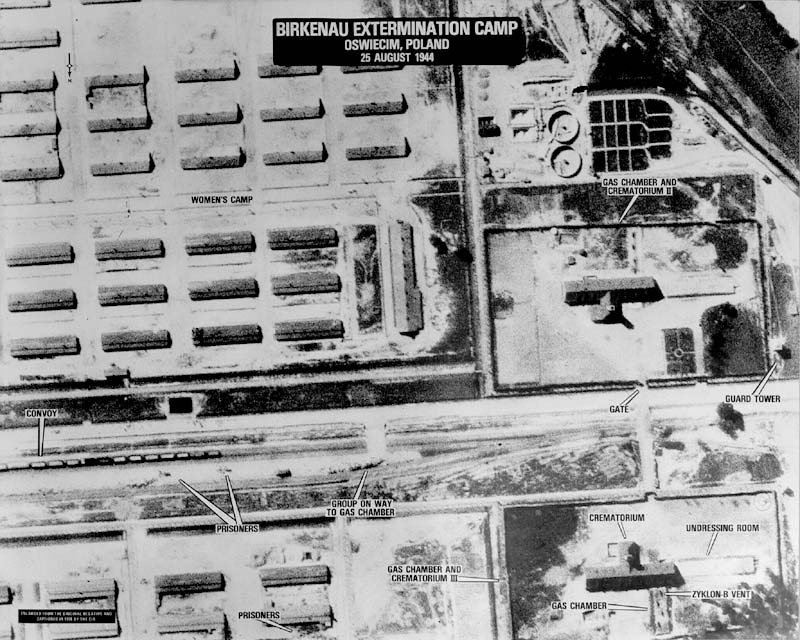
An aerial photo of Auschwitz concentration camp shows a recently arrived transport on the rail spur that terminated in the camp, which was built in May 1944. The selection process has been completed and those selected to be gassed are being led to Crematorium II, as shown by the open gate into the grounds of the complex.

Gröning's responsibilities included sorting and counting the multitude of currencies taken from arriving deportees, sending it to Berlin, and guarding the belongings of arrivals until they were sorted. He related that he was astonished to learn of the extermination process, but later accepted his part in it, stating that his work became "routine" after several months.

His bureaucratic job did not shield him completely from physical acts of the extermination process: as early as his first day, Gröning saw children hidden on the train and people unable to walk who had remained among the rubbish and debris after the selection process had been completed, being shot. Gröning also heard:

...a baby crying. The child was lying on the ramp, wrapped in rags. A mother had left it behind, perhaps because she knew that women with infants were sent to the gas chambers immediately. I saw another SS soldier grab the baby by the legs. The crying had bothered him. He smashed the baby's head against the iron side of a truck until it was silent.

After witnessing this, Gröning claimed, he went to his boss and told him that he could not work at Auschwitz anymore, stating that if the extermination of the Jews is necessary, "then at least it should be done within a certain framework". Gröning claims that his superior officer denied this request citing a document he had signed before being posted, forcing him to continue his work.

One night towards the end of 1942, Gröning and others in their SS barracks on the outskirts of Birkenau were awakened by an alarm. They were told that a number of Jews who were being taken to the gas chambers had escaped and hidden in the woods. They were ordered to take pistols and search the woods. When his group arrived at the extermination area of the camp they saw a farmhouse, in front of which were SS men and the bodies of seven or eight prisoners who had been caught and shot. The SS men told Gröning and his comrades that they could go home, but they decided to remain in the shadows of the woods. They watched as an SS man put on a gas mask and emptied a tin of Zyklon B into a hatch in the cottage wall. Gröning said the humming noise from inside "turned to screaming" for a minute, then to silence. A comrade later showed him the bodies being burnt in a pit. A kapo there told him details of the burning, such as how gases developed in the body and made the burning corpses move.

Gröning claimed that this disrupted the relative tranquillity his job gave him and that he yet again complained to his superior. His boss listened but reminded him of the pledge that he and his fellow SS men made. Gröning thus returned to work. He declared that he manipulated his life at Auschwitz so as to avoid witnessing the camp's most unpalatable aspects.

== After Auschwitz ==
=== Great Britain ===
Gröning's application to transfer to a unit on the front-line was successful, and in 1944 he joined an SS unit fighting in the Battle of the Bulge in the Ardennes. He was wounded and sent to a field hospital before rejoining his unit, which eventually surrendered to the British Army.

He realised that declaring "involvement in the concentration camp of Auschwitz would have a negative response", and so tried not to draw attention to it, putting on the form given to him by the British that he worked for the SS-Wirtschafts-Verwaltungshauptamt instead. He said he did this because "the victor's always right", and that things happened at Auschwitz which "did not always comply with human rights".

Gröning and the rest of his SS colleagues were imprisoned in an old Nazi concentration camp. He was later sent to the UK as a forced labourer in 1946 where he had a "very comfortable life". He ate good food and earned money, and travelled through the Midlands and Scotland giving concerts for four months, singing German hymns and traditional English folk songs to appreciative British audiences.

Gröning's name appeared in a file of the United Nations War Crimes Commission from 6 March 1947, listing 300 Germans stationed at Auschwitz suspected of war crimes by Marian Muszkat, the UNWCC representative of the Polish People's Republic. Gröning's entry accused him of "complicity in murder and ill-treatment". No further investigations were made after Sir Robert Craigie, representing the Foreign Office of Great Britain, asked the commission to stop taking new cases in April 1947 to instead focus on rebuilding Germany, a decision fiercely contested by Poland and Yugoslavia. As a result, any members of the SS within Allied custody who did not already have criminal proceedings against them were set for unconditional release.

=== Return to Germany ===
Gröning was released and returned to Germany in 1947 or 1948. Upon being reunited with his wife, he said: "Girl, do both of us a favour: don't ask." He was unable to regain his job at the bank due to having been a member of the SS, so he got a job at a glass factory in his hometown of Nienburg, working his way up to a management position, becoming head of personnel. For twelve years, Gröning served as an honorary lay judge at the industrial tribunal of Nienburg's court.

Upon return to Germany, Gröning lived with his father-in-law. At the dinner table, they once made "a silly remark about Auschwitz", implying that he was a "potential or real murderer," whereupon Gröning became enraged, banging his fist on the table and demanding: "This word and this connection are never, ever, to be mentioned again in my presence, otherwise I'll move out!" Gröning said that this request was respected. Gröning made a conscious effort to avoid any media about the Holocaust, such as TV broadcasts of the 1978 miniseries Holocaust (which was watched by roughly 50% of Germany's adult population on release) or Schindler's List.

Until the turn of the 21st century, Gröning was unaware that a second Auschwitz trial took place during the 1960s, headed by West German authorities. In 1977, Gröning was one of 62 former members of the SS to be investigated by Frankfurt's prosecutor's office, being directly questioned in 1978, but the inquiry ended without indictments in 1985.

==== Views on Holocaust denial ====
Gröning led a normal middle-class life after the war. A keen stamp collector, he was a member of the local philately club and during an annual meeting in 1985, he fell into a conversation about politics with the man next to him. The man told him it was "terrible" that Holocaust denial was illegal in Germany, and went on to tell Gröning how so many bodies could not have been burnt, and that the volume of gas that was supposed to have been used would have killed all living things in the vicinity.

Gröning said little in response to these statements, replying only: "I know a little more about that, we should discuss it some time." The man recommended a pamphlet by Holocaust denier Thies Christophersen, also a former SS officer stationed at Auschwitz. After reading the pamphlet, Gröning returned it with additional notes containing his own commentary, which included the words:

I saw everything. The gas chambers, the cremations, the selection process. One and a half million Jews were murdered in Auschwitz. I was there.

Six months later, Gröning began receiving phone calls and letters from strangers who tried to tell him Auschwitz was not actually a place for exterminating human beings in gas chambers.

It became apparent that his comments condemning Holocaust denial had been printed in a neo-Nazi magazine, and that most of the anonymous calls and letters were "From people who tried to prove that what I had seen with my own eyes, what I had experienced in Auschwitz was a big, big mistake, a big hallucination on my part because it hadn't happened."

As a result of such comments, Gröning decided to speak openly about his experiences, and publicly denounce people who maintain the events he witnessed never happened. He said his message to Holocaust deniers was:

I would like you to believe me. I saw the gas chambers. I saw the crematoria. I saw the open fires. I would like you to believe that these atrocities happened, because I was there.

Over the course of three weeks, he wrote an 87-page memoir, which he then mailed to his two adult sons. Afterwards, Gröning added more pages to his writings, produced copies of them, and distributed them to friends. Gröning felt that he was being judged for his self-admitted involvement in Auschwitz by his children and friends and struggled to explain his actions during letter exchanges with his youngest son.

In 1991, Gröning appeared as a witness in the trial of former Auschwitz guard and fellow SS member Heinrich Kühnemann, who was accused of murdering six Jewish internees and aiding in the murder of multiple others by Duisburg's regional court. Presiding judge Dirk Struß, who later testified in Gröning's own trial, remembered that the witness was stoic while describing the everyday occurrences at Auschwitz's entrance ramp. Struß in particular remembered that when Gröning was asked why he sought transfer from this duty, Gröning responded, "Because it stank". Procedures against Kühnemann were ultimately closed by the Federal Constitutional Court in 1993.

== Later comments ==
Gröning did not consider himself guilty of any crime, because he was in no way directly involved in the killing. He described his part in the extermination machine as an involuntary "small cog in the gears", which gave him involuntary guilt in turn. Citing his summons to testify against a member of the SS accused of murdering prisoners at Auschwitz, he also said he was innocent in the eyes of the law, pointing to the fact that he spoke as a witness and not as a defendant.

In the 2005 BBC book and DVD set Auschwitz: The Nazis and 'The Final Solution', for which Gröning provided an interview, author Laurence Rees indicates that although Gröning had requested to leave Auschwitz after he witnessed killings, his objection was only on the basis of its practical implementation, and not on the general militaristic principle of the mass extermination of enemies. Gröning said that he thought at the time that it was justified due to all the Nazi propaganda he had been subjected to, in that Germany's enemies were being destroyed, which to him made the tools of their destruction (such as gas chambers) of no particular significance. Because of this, he said his feelings about seeing people and knowing that they had hours to live before being gassed were "very ambiguous".

He explained that children were murdered because, while the children themselves were not the enemy, the danger was the blood within them, in that they could grow up to become dangerous Jews. Rees points to Gröning's ultra-nationalist upbringing as indication of how he was able to justify the extermination of helpless children. Gröning said that the horrors in the gas chambers did eventually dawn on him when he heard the screams.

Rees writes that Gröning described his time at Auschwitz as if he were talking about another Oskar Gröning at Auschwitz—and as a result, the post-war Gröning spoke more candidly about his time there by segregating the Gröning that contributed to the running of a death camp from the modern Gröning that condemns Nazi ideology.

Gröning said that the screams of those in the gas chambers had never left him, and he never returned to Auschwitz because of his shame. He said he felt guilt towards the Jewish people, and for being part of the organisation that committed crimes against them, despite "not having been one of the perpetrators myself". He asked for forgiveness from God and from the Jewish people.

== Criminal charges and trial ==
In September 2014, it was reported that Gröning, then aged 93, had been charged by state prosecutors with having been an accessory to murder for his role at Auschwitz receiving and processing prisoners and their personal belongings. The indictment stated that Gröning economically advanced Nazi Germany and aided the systematic killing of 300,000 of the 425,000 Hungarian Jews who were deported to Auschwitz by 137 railway transports during the summer of 1944.

Gröning's prosecution has been reported to have been a part of Germany's final effort to bring the last Nazi war-crimes suspects to justice. State prosecutors managed to charge the defendant on a legal precedent set in 2011 by the conviction of the former Sobibor extermination camp guard John Demjanjuk by a court in Munich for his presence as a guard at the camp rather than for a specific act of murder.

The trial commenced on 20 April 2015 at Lüneburg Regional Court (Landgericht). In an opening statement, Gröning asked for forgiveness for his mainly clerical role at Auschwitz in the summer of 1944, by saying: "For me there's no question that I share moral guilt", the 93-year-old told the judges, acknowledging he knew about the gassing of Jews and other prisoners. "I ask for forgiveness. I share morally in the guilt but whether I am guilty under criminal law, you will have to decide."

During the trial, several of the 60 "co-claimants" (Note: Under the procedural order of the German code for criminal law, a victim of certain offences, or a spouse, life partner, child, sibling or parent of a homicide victim, can choose to act as a "co-claimant" [Nebenkläger], in addition to the public prosecutor who acts as claimant during a trial. This entails certain procedural rights. For more, see de:Nebenklage#Deutschland.) gave evidence.

Eva Mozes Kor, who was 10 years old when she arrived at Auschwitz, testified that she and her twin sister were used for the cruel medical experiments conducted by Josef Mengele and that she had lost her parents and older sisters in Auschwitz. Kor conversed with and embraced the defendant after giving evidence, while other Holocaust survivors in the courtroom protested against this gesture. Another witness, Max Eisen, who was 15 years old at the time of entry into Auschwitz, described the brutality of the extermination part of the camp, including extracting gold teeth from dead victims. On 12 May 2015, Susan Pollack, an 84-year-old Briton, gave evidence of how she was taken from Hungary to Auschwitz and Bergen-Belsen; describing the living conditions encountered at Auschwitz, she said: "I was in a barrack with about 800 other girls ... we were losing weight, we weren't able to use our minds anymore".

That same day, Ivor Perl, an 83-year-old Briton who was born in Hungary into a religious Jewish family, also gave evidence; Perl testified that he was 12 years old when he arrived at Auschwitz and that he and his brother lost their parents and seven siblings in the Holocaust. In July, Irene Weiss, an 84-year-old survivor from the United States, testified that her family was torn apart on arrival at Auschwitz in May 1944, during the mass deportation of Hungarian Jews and that she had lost both her parents, four siblings and 13 cousins at Auschwitz.

=== Verdict and sentence ===
On 15 July 2015, he was found guilty of being an accessory to the murder of at least 300,000 Jews. Reacting to the sentence, Auschwitz survivor Kor said that she was "disappointed" adding: "I would like the court to prove to me, a survivor, how four years in jail will benefit anybody." Gröning's defence lawyer, Hans Holtermann, reviewed the decision before planning to appeal.

On 28 November 2016, the appeal was declined by the German Federal Court of Justice (BGH). In August 2017, Gröning was judged to be fit for prison. An appeal to the Federal Constitutional Court also failed. The latter court ruled his age was not a valid reason not to send him to jail.

On 15 January 2018, Gröning applied for pardon as a last measure to avoid imprisonment. The pardon was rejected.

On 9 March 2018, Gröning died while hospitalized in Lower Saxony before he was to begin his sentence. He was 96.

== See also ==
- Little Eichmanns
- Reinhold Hanning
- Ursula Haverbeck
- The Accountant of Auschwitz
