= Werner Georg Haverbeck =

German historian and folklorist (1909–1999)

Werner Georg Haverbeck (28 October 1909 – 18 October 1999) was a German historian and folklorist from Bonn. During World War II he was a member of the Nazi Party, serving in the Sturmabteilung, and reaching the rank of Untersturmführer. He had been a leader of the Nazi Party's German Labour Front and a direct subordinate of Rudolf Heß. He was the founder and director in 1933 of the German Imperial Federation of Nation and Homeland [de], as well as a parson of The Christian Community.

== Personal life ==
Haverbeck was married to Ursula Haverbeck (1928 – 2024), a Holocaust denier and convicted Neo-Nazi.
