= Reinhold Hanning =

Waffen-SS soldier (1921–2017)

Reinhold Hanning (28 December 1921 – 30 May 2017) was an SS guard at the Auschwitz concentration camp in occupied Poland.

Hanning volunteered for the Waffen SS at the age of 18 at the urging of his stepmother. During the Holocaust, he was an SS guard from early 1942 until June 1944. Nearly one million Jews and tens of thousands of other victims were murdered at the death camp. Hanning was one of the SS men who met Jewish prisoners as they arrived at the camp in Holocaust trains and escorted them to the gas chambers.

In 2016, Hanning was convicted in a Detmold court as an accessory to 170,000 murders, following a trial in which Holocaust survivors testified against him. He apologized for participation in the Holocaust. He died a year later at the age of 95.

== Life ==
Hanning grew up in Lippe where he attended elementary school. After leaving school he worked in a factory.

At the age of 14 he joined the Hitler Youth and four years later he volunteered for the Waffen-SS. Following the onset of World War II, Hanning served with the 2nd SS Panzer Division Das Reich. He fought in several battles before being hit by grenade splinters in his head and leg during close combat in Kiev in 1941.

Following the injury, his commander decided he was no longer fit for front-line duty and in January 1942 assigned him to Auschwitz.

In September 1943 he was promoted to Unterscharführer while at Auschwitz. In June 1944, he was transferred to Sachsenhausen concentration camp. Hanning became a prisoner of war in May 1945. He was released on 20 May 1948. For a short time, he worked as a cook for the British forces in Lage (Lippe) and then as a truck driver for a dairy company and as a salesman. In 1964 he started his own business and retired in 1984.

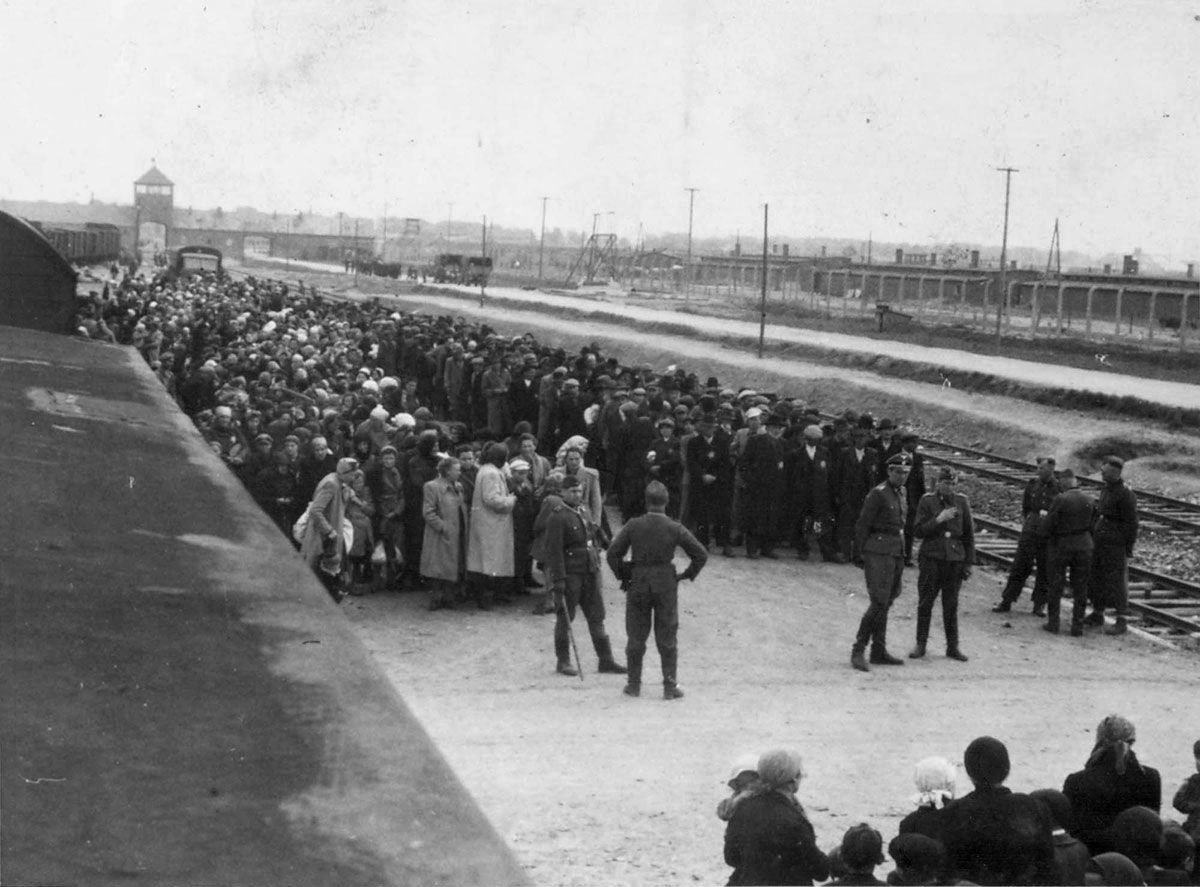
Auschwitz II Birkenau: SS men meet new arrivals at the selection platform

== Trial ==
Hanning was one of some 30 former Auschwitz guards investigated in 2013 by the German federal prosecutors from special office in Ludwigsburg with the recommendation that they pursue charges after the major war crimes policy review. Until 2009, prosecutors were required to prove that an accused Nazi was responsible for killing a victim in order to obtain a conviction. In the trial of John Demjanjuk, the defendant was found guilty even though he did not directly kill any of his victims, and was convicted of being an accessory to murders.

In 2016, Hanning was convicted in a court in Detmold, Germany, of 170,000 counts of being an accessory to murder. Several Holocaust survivors testified against him.

In court, Hanning said, "People were shot, gassed and burned. I could see how corpses were taken back and forth or moved out. I could smell the burning bodies." During the trial, Hanning apologized for doing nothing to prevent the Holocaust atrocities he witnessed at Auschwitz saying "I am ashamed that I saw injustice and never did anything about it, and I apologize for my actions,” but denied the charges.

Hanning was sentenced to five years in prison. Hanning never served time as he died while appeals to the Federal Court of Justice were pending. He died on 30 May 2017 in Lage, North Rhine-Westphalia, at the age of 95.

== See also ==
- Oskar Gröning
- John Demjanjuk
