= List of last surviving people suspected of participation in Nazi war crimes =

This is a list of the last surviving people suspected of participation in Nazi war crimes, based on wanted lists published by Efraim Zuroff of the Simon Wiesenthal Center. Beginning in 2002, Zuroff produced an Annual Status Report on the Worldwide Investigation and Prosecution of Nazi war criminals which from 2004 to 2018 included a list of the "most-wanted" criminals who had never been convicted. Of those who have been charged for Nazi war crimes in the 21st century, many died awaiting trial, died during the appeals process, or died while waiting to be deported. Very few served actual prison time due to their advanced age which made their sentences (if any) symbolic. On the other hand, some listed here had all charges against them cleared after the fact.

Over 200,000 Nazis are estimated to have been perpetrators of Nazi-era crimes. Of these, roughly 140,000 cases were brought between 1945 and 2005. According to professor Mary Fulbrook, only 6,656 of them were ever convicted. It remains unknown how many or if any legitimate Nazi fugitives remain today. However, The Washington Post estimated in 2014 that the hunt for fugitives could possibly continue into the 2040s, citing the "age someone would have had to have been at the time" and "average life expectancy".

== Located ==
Those marked in yellow are still living.

Name	Served in	Position/Rank	Tried/Convicted	Date of birth	Date of death	Last residence	Short summary
Rosemarie Albrecht	Aktion T4	Medical professor	No/No	19 March 1915	7 January 2008 (Age 92)	Germany	A former medical professor at the University of Jena, Albrecht was accused of killing a patient in 1941, as part of the Nazi euthanasia program which carried out mass killings of the mentally ill and physically disabled. She was further linked to the deaths of 159 people at a hospital in Stadtroda. In 2005, Albrecht was ruled unfit to stand trial. She died in 2008.
Aksel Andersen	Waffen-SS	Foreign volunteer (Camp guard)	No/No	18 June 1924	29 June 2018 (Age 94)	Sweden	A Danish foreign volunteer of the Waffen-SS, Andersen served as a guard in the Judenlager in Babruysk, Belarus during 1942 and 1943, when 1,400 Jewish inmates were killed. Danish authorities have refused to prosecute Andersen. He died on 29 June 2018, at the age of 94.
Milivoj Ašner	Croatian police	Police officer	No/No	21 April 1913	14 June 2011 (Age 98)	Austria	Ašner served as the police chief of Slavonska Požega, Croatia, and was accused of taking part in the persecution and deportation of hundreds of Serbs, Jews and Romani to concentration camps operated by the Ustaše. Ašner moved to Austria after the war. In 2005, Croatian authorities requested his extradition, which was refused on medical grounds. Ašner died in Klagenfurt in June 2011 at the age of 98.
Heinrich Boere	Waffen-SS	Foreign volunteer	Yes/Yes (died in prison)	27 September 1921	1 December 2013 (Age 92)	Germany	Boere was a Dutch volunteer of Waffen-SS who saw action on the Eastern Front. As a member of the Silbertanne death squad, he took part in the killings of three Dutch civilians. He fled to Germany after the war and was sentenced to death in absentia by a Dutch court in 1949, which was later commuted to life imprisonment. German authorities refused to extradite him, but reopened the case in 2008 and convicted him in 2010, sentencing him to life in prison. He died on 1 December 2013 at the age of 92 while serving his life sentence in Fröndenberg.
László Csizsik-Csatáry	Royal Hungarian Police	Captain	Yes/Yes (never served sentence)	4 March 1915	10 August 2013 (Age 98)	Hungary	Csatáry was a Royal Hungarian Police officer based in Košice who organized the deportation of approximately 15,700 Jews to Auschwitz in 1944. He was convicted in absentia in Czechoslovakia and was sentenced to death. Csatáry fled to Canada after the war, but after his citizenship was revoked in 1997 he left the country. In 2011, Csatáry was discovered to be living in Budapest, and the following year he was charged with war crimes by Hungarian authorities. In 2013, a Slovak court commuted his death sentence to life imprisonment and sought his extradition. In the same year, Hungarian courts suspended his case on the grounds of double jeopardy. Csatáry died in August 2013 while awaiting trial, aged 98.
Algimantas Dailidė	Lithuanian Security Police	-	Yes/Yes (never served sentence)	12 March 1921	2015 (Age 93–94)	Germany	Dailidė served in the Lithuanian Security Police (Saugumas) in Vilnius and took part in the persecution of Polish Jews in the Vilna Ghetto. He emigrated to the United States after the war and lived in Cleveland, Ohio, and Florida. Dailidė was stripped of his citizenship in the 1990s and deported to Germany in 2004, after which he settled in Kirchberg, Saxony. He was subsequently convicted of war crimes by a Vilnius court, but in 2008 was deemed unfit to serve time in prison due to his poor health. He died in 2015.
Ivan Demjanjuk	SS-Totenkopfverbände	Camp guard (Trawniki men)	Yes/Yes (never served sentence)	3 April 1920	12 March 2012 (Age 91)	United States	Born in Soviet Ukraine, Demjanjuk was conscripted into the Soviet Army in 1941 and was taken prisoner by the Germans in 1942. He served at the Trawniki SS training camp before becoming a guard at the Sobibor extermination camp, where he was accused of being an accessory to the murder of 27,900 Jews. He also served at additional camps including Majdanek. Demjanjuk moved to the United States after the war and settled in Cleveland, Ohio. He was denaturalized in 1981 and extradited to Israel, and in 1988 he was convicted of crimes against humanity and sentenced to death. The verdict was overturned by the Supreme Court of Israel in 1993 after new evidence cast doubt on his identity. Demjanjuk returned to the US and regained his citizenship, but was denaturalized a second time in 2002 when new allegations arose. He was extradited to Germany in 2009, convicted in 2011 and sentenced to five years in prison pending appeal. Demjanjuk died in March 2012 before his appeals could be completed, which in effect voided his prior conviction.
Bruno Dey	SS-Totenkopfverbände	Camp Guard	Yes/Yes	28 August 1927	Living (Age 99)	Germany	Bruno Dey was a former SS guard at the Stutthof concentration camp between August 1944 and April 1945, when he was 17 years old. In 2019, he was charged with complicity in the murder of 5,232 prisoners. Due to his age at the time of the crimes, Dey was tried in a juvenile court. He acknowledged serving as a guard but denied being a Nazi supporter or directly participating in killings. In July 2020, the court found him guilty of accessory to murder and sentenced him to two years' probation.
Peter Egner	Sicherheitsdienst		No/No	1 February 1922	26 January 2011 (Age 88)	United States	An ethnic German born in Yugoslavia, Egner served in the Sicherheitsdienst in Belgrade from 1941 to 1943, during which time the unit participated in the mass murder of more than 17,000 civilians. He also served in the Belgrade Einsatzgruppe and transported prisoners to Auschwitz, Semlin and Avala. Egner moved to the United States after the war and worked as a food and beverage manager. The US Justice Department requested the revocation of his citizenship in 2008, and in 2010 Serbia requested his extradition. Egner died in January 2011 in Bellevue, Washington at the age of 88 while awaiting trial.
Klaas Carel Faber	Waffen-SS	Foreign volunteer	Yes/Yes (arrested/sentenced to life imprisonment by a Dutch court in 1948, escaped to Germany in 1952.)	20 January 1922	24 May 2012 (Age 90)	Germany	Faber was a Dutch volunteer of the Waffen-SS and served in the Sonderkommando Feldmeijer, which targeted members of the Dutch resistance, opponents of Nazism and those who hid Jews. He was also alleged to have served in the firing squad at the Westerbork transit camp. Faber was sentenced to death in 1947 by a Dutch court for murder. His sentence was later commuted to life imprisonment, but in 1952 he escaped from prison and fled to Germany. Several attempts to extradite him were unsuccessful. In 2010, the Dutch government issued a European Arrest Warrant for Faber. German authorities supported his imprisonment, but Faber died in May 2012 in Ingolstadt before the motion could be enforced.
Irmgard Furchner	Stutthof concentration camp	Concentration camp secretary Stenographer	Yes/Yes	29 May 1925	14 January 2025 (Age 99)	Germany	A former concentration camp secretary and stenographer at Stutthof concentration camp for camp commandant Paul-Werner Hoppe. In 2021, at the age of 96, she was charged with 11,412 counts of accessory to murder and 18 additional counts of accessory to attempted murder, and in December 2022 she was found guilty and sentenced to a suspended jail term of two years. This conviction would also later be upheld by the German Federal Court of Justice in August 2024.
Gregor Formanek	Waffen-SS	Foreign volunteer (Camp guard)	Yes/Yes	1924	April 2, 2025 (Age 100–101)	Germany	A Romanian foreign volunteer of the Waffen-SS who had a German father, Formanek served in the Guard Battalion at Sachsenhausen concentration camp. Indicted in August 2023 under accusations of aiding and abetting murder of over 3,300 Holocaust victims between July 1943 and February 1945, Formanek could be the last of the Sachsenhausen camp supervisors to be tried, though it has been acknowledged that his ability to stand trial is limited. In June 2024, a German court ruled that Formanek was unfit to stand trial, though an appeal would be likely. A Frankfurt court later would order him to stand trial in December 2024. However, Fornamek died on April 2, 2025, a few days before a ruling could be made by the regional court in Hanau on whether he could stand trial; his death would be reported 28 days after it happened. Fornamek previously served only 10 years of a 25-year sentence in a Soviet prison.
Mikhail Gorshkow	Gestapo		No/No	1923	2013 (Age 89–90)	Estonia	Born in Estonia, Gorshkow served as an interpreter and interrogator for the Gestapo in Belarus and was accused of taking part in the massacre of 3,000 Jews in Slutsk. In 2002, it was reported that a man with the surname "Gorshkow" fled to the United States after the war but was denaturalized and moved to Estonia. Estonian authorities closed the case against Gorshkow in 2011, claiming that his identity could not be proved beyond reasonable doubt. Of issue was the possibility that more than one person with the surname Gorshkow collaborated with the Nazis. Gorshkow later died sometime in 2013.
Kurt Gosdek	Allgemeine SS ( Einsatzgruppe C)		No/No	Unknown	12 December 2021	Germany	Gosdek served in Einsatzgruppe C and was accused of being involved in the massacre of tens of thousands of Jews in Ukraine, including at Babi Yar. Gosdek was later found to be living in Northwestern Germany and denied any involvement. In a 2017 interview he claimed he "worked behind the lines repairing vehicles". Kurt Gosdek was never charged as Efraim Zuroff reported his death on 12 December 2021.
Oskar Gröning	Waffen-SS	SS-Unterscharführer (bookkeeper)	Yes/Yes (never served sentence)	10 June 1921	9 March 2018 (Age 96)	Germany	Gröning served as a bookkeeper at the Auschwitz concentration camp from 1942 to 1944. In July 2015, he was found guilty of being an accessory to the murder of 300,000 people and sentenced to four years in prison. Gröning died in March 2018 at the age of 96, before he was set to begin his sentence.
Reinhold Hanning	Waffen-SS	SS-Unterscharführer	Yes/Yes (never served sentence)	28 December 1921	30 May 2017 (Age 95)	Germany	Hanning served as an SS guard at Auschwitz from January 1943 to June 1944 and was charged with accessory to murder in 170,000 cases. He was convicted and sentenced to 5 years' imprisonment on 17 June 2016. Hanning never served his sentence as he died on 30 May 2017, aged 95, while awaiting appeal.
Wilhelm Karl Friedrich Hoffmeister	Allgemeine SS ( Einsatzgruppe C)		No/No	Unknown	12 December 2021	Germany	Hoffmeister served in Einsatzgruppe C and was accused of being involved in the massacre of tens of thousands of Jews in Ukraine, including at Babi Yar. On 12 December 2021, Efraim Zuroff reported that Hoffmeister had died.
Yaroslav Hunka	Waffen-SS (14th Waffen Grenadier Division of the SS (1st Galician))	Foreign volunteer (Rottenführer)	No/No	March 19, 1925	Living (Age 101)	Canada	Hunka is a Waffen SS veteran whose unit is implicated in the Huta Pieniacka massacre. Representatives of both Poland and Russia have expressed their desire for Hunka to be extradited and stand trial for war crimes.
Ivan (John) Kalymon	Ukrainian Auxiliary Police	Police officer	No/No	1921	2014 (Age 92–93)	United States	Kalymon served in the Nazi-led Ukrainian Auxiliary Police in Lviv from 1941 to 1944, during which time he took part in the murder and deportation of Jews in the Lwów Ghetto. Kalymon moved to the United States after the war, but had his citizenship revoked in 2007. He died near Detroit, Michigan, in 2014 at the age of 93 while awaiting extradition to Germany.
Søren Kam	Waffen-SS	Foreign volunteer (Obersturmführer)	No/No	2 November 1921	23 March 2015 (Age 93)	Germany	A Danish volunteer officer of the SS Wiking Division, Kam took part in the murder of Danish anti-Nazi newspaper editor Carl Henrik Clemmensen. Denmark requested his extradition in 1999, which Germany refused. A subsequent request in 2007 was again refused, due to a German court finding that the killing of Clemmensen was manslaughter, the statute of limitations of which had expired. Kam died in Kempten in 2015 at the age of 93.
Michael Karkoc	Waffen-SS	Foreign volunteer (Obersturmführer)	No/No	6 March 1919	14 December 2019 (Age 100)	United States	Karkoc was an officer in the SS-led Ukrainian Self Defense Legion, which is accused of murdering Polish civilians in Chłaniów in July 1944. His unit was also involved in the suppression of the Warsaw Uprising. Karkoc went on to serve in the Waffen-SS Galician Division. He moved to the United States after the war, settling in Minneapolis. Karkoc's background was uncovered in a 2013 report by the Associated Press, prompting investigations in Germany and Poland. German authorities closed his case in 2015 after they deemed Karkoc unfit to stand trial. He died in Minneapolis on 14 December 2019 at the age of 100.
Vladimir Katriuk	Schutzmannschaft		No/No	1 October 1921	22 May 2015 (Age 93)	Canada	A former commander of the Ukrainian Schutzmannschaft Battalion 118, Katriuk was accused to taking part in the 1943 Khatyn massacre, as well as murdering Jews and non-Jews in various locations across Belarus. He later defected and joined the French Foreign Legion, before deserting and fleeing to Canada after the war. The Government of Canada began proceedings to revoke his citizenship in the 1990s, but decided against revocation in 2007, due to a lack of evidence. Katriuk died in Salaberry-de-Valleyfield in May 2015 at the age of 93.
Sándor Képíró	Gendarmerie	Officer	Yes/Yes (initial trials, later retried and acquitted)	18 February 1914	3 September 2011 (Age 97)	Hungary	Képíró was an officer of the Hungarian gendarmerie who was accused of organizing the mass murder of over a thousand Jewish, Serb and Roma civilians in Novi Sad, Serbia in January 1942. He was convicted of war crimes in Hungary in 1944 but was not punished. In 1946 he was again convicted in Hungary in absentia. Képíró moved to Argentina after the war, returning to Hungary in 1996. A new trial was opened against him in 2011. He was acquitted due to insufficient evidence in July, and died in September in Budapest at the age of 97.
Helma Kissner	Waffen-SS	Radio operator	No/No	22 December 1923	7 September 2019 (Age 95)	Germany	Kissner served as a radio operator at the Auschwitz concentration camp from April to July 1944 and was charged with accessory to murder in 260,000 cases. She was ruled unfit to stand trial on 9 September 2016 by a court in Kiel.
Samuel Kunz	SS-Totenkopfverbände	Camp guard (Trawniki men)	No/No	1921	18 November 2010 (Age 88–89)	Germany	Born in Russia to a Volga German family, Kunz served in the Red Army and was captured by the Germans. He then served at the Trawniki SS training camp before serving as an SS guard at the Belzec extermination camp, where he was accused of participating in the mass murder of Jews. Kunz worked as a civil servant after the war. He was indicted in July 2010, but died in November in Bonn at the age of 89 before he could be brought to trial.
Hans (Antanus) Lipschis	Waffen-SS	SS-Rottenführer	No/No	7 November 1919	16 June 2016 (Age 96)	Germany	Lipschis served as a guard at the Auschwitz concentration camp from 1941 to 1945. He emigrated to the United States after the war and lived in Chicago until his deportation to Germany in 1983. Lipschis was arrested in 2013, but was later found unfit to stand trial due to dementia. He died in Aalen in 2016 at the age of 96.
Harry Männil	Estonian political police	Police officer	No/No (investigated, no actionable evidence apparently found)	17 May 1920	11 January 2010 (Age 89)	Venezuela	Männil served in the Estonian political police during the first year of the German occupation and was accused of arresting Jews and communists who were subsequently executed by the Nazis. He moved to Venezuela after the war and became a highly successful businessman and philanthropist. Estonian authorities opened an investigation against Männil in 2001, but later cleared him of all charges. He relocated to Costa Rica and died in San José in January 2010 at the age of 89.
Adam Nagorny	SS-Totenkopfverbände	Camp guard (Trawniki men)	No/No	Unknown	2011	Germany	Nagorny served as an SS guard at the Trawniki SS training camp and the Treblinka extermination camp. He was accused of taking part in executions at Treblinka. Investigations against Nagorny opened in early 2011, but he died later in the year.
Ladislav Nižňanský	Edelweiss	Unit commander	Yes/No (acquitted due to insufficient evidence)	24 October 1917	23 December 2011 (Age 94)	Germany	Nižňanský served as the commander of an "Edelweiss" unit that hunted Jews and partisans in Slovakia. He was accused of being involved in the massacre of 146 people in two villages and the later killing of 18 Jewish civilians. Nižňanský moved to Germany after the war and was sentenced to death in absentia by a Czechoslovak court in 1962. He was tried in 2005 and acquitted by a German court due to a lack of reliable evidence. Nižňanský died in December 2011.
Helmut Oberlander	Allgemeine-SS (Einsatzgruppe D)		No/No	15 February 1924	20 September 2021 (Age 97)	Canada	Oberlander served in Einsatzkommando 10A (part of Einsatzgruppe D), which murdered an estimated 23,000 mostly Jewish civilians in Ukraine. He moved to Canada after the war, settling in Waterloo, Ontario where he worked as a real-estate developer. Beginning in 1995, the Government of Canada made several attempts to revoke Oberlander's citizenship and have him deported. Oberlander died in Waterloo, Ontario on 10 September 2021 at the age of 97 before a successful attempt could be made.
Jakiw "Jakob" Palij	SS-Totenkopfverbände	Camp guard (Trawniki men)	No/No	16 August 1923	10 January 2019 (Age 95)	United States	Born in a Ukrainian village in the Second Polish Republic, Palij volunteered for the SS and served as a guard at the Trawniki SS training camp. He moved to the United States after the war, settling in Queens, New York City. Palij was identified as a camp guard in 1993 and had his US citizenship revoked in 2003, rendering him stateless. He was deported to Germany in August 2018 after a 14-year deportation battle. Palij died in January 2019 in Ahlen at the age of 95.
Lajos Polgár	Arrow Cross Party		No/No	1916	12 July 2006 (Age 89–90)	Australia	Polgár was a high-ranking member of the Hungarian Arrow Cross Party and briefly served as chief of its Budapest headquarters, where Jews were jailed and tortured. He moved to Australia after the war. Australian and Hungarian authorities opened investigations in the 2000s but did not obtain sufficient evidence against him. Polgár died in Ferntree Gully in July 2006 at the age of 89.
Jack Reimer	SS-Totenkopfverbände	Camp guard (Trawniki men)	No/No	6 November 1918	3 August 2005 (Age 86)	United States	Born to German Mennonite parents in Ukraine, Reimer was conscripted into the Soviet Red Army and was captured by the Germans in 1941. He served as a guard at the Trawniki SS training camp and was accused of taking part in the murder of Polish Jews. He moved to the United States after the war and became a businessman. Reimer was denaturalized in 2002, but died in Pennsylvania in 2005 before he could be deported.
Johann Robert Riss	Wehrmacht	Soldier	Yes/Yes (found guilty in absentia by Italy, never served sentence)	1921	10 October 2019 (Age 97–98)	Germany	Riss took part in the August 1944 Padule di Fucecchio massacre, where 184 civilians were murdered. In 2011, the military court in Rome found him guilty in absentia and sentenced him to life in prison; Germany has declined to extradite Riss. He died on 10 October 2019 in Kaufbeuren, at the age of 98.
Nada Šakić	Ustashe	Camp guard	No/No	Unknown	2011	Croatia	The wife of Croatian Ustaše officer and Jasenovac commander Dinko Šakić, Nada Šakić served as a guard at the nearby Stara Gradiška concentration camp and was accused of taking part in the torture and murder of inmates. The Šakićs fled to Argentina at the end of the war but were extradited back to Croatia in 1998. Charges against Nada Šakić were later dropped due to insufficient evidence. She died in February 2011 at the age of 85.
Josef Schütz	Waffen-SS	SS- Rottenführer	Yes/Yes (never served sentence)	16 November 1920	11 April 2023 (Age 102)	Germany	Josef Schütz, known in the German press as "Josef S.", was a Lithuanian-born German Nazi concentration camp guard who was stationed at the Sachsenhausen concentration camp. In June 2022, at the age of 101, Schütz was handed a five year sentence after a criminal trial for complicity in war crimes during the Holocaust during World War II, becoming the oldest person tried and convicted for Nazi war crimes in Germany.
Gerhard Sommer	Waffen-SS	Untersturmführer	Yes/Yes (by Italy, never served sentence)	24 June 1921	2019 (Age 97–98)	Germany	Sommer served in the 16th SS Panzergrenadier Division and was accused of taking part in the Sant'Anna di Stazzema massacre in 1944. He was found guilty in absentia by a military court in La Spezia in 2005, but Germany refused to extradite him. German authorities reopened his case in 2014. In May 2015, he was declared unfit for trial due to severe dementia. He died in 2019.
Alfred Stork	Gebirgsjäger	Corporal	Yes/Yes (in absentia by Italy; never served sentence)	1923	28 October 2018 (Age 94–95)	Germany	Stork was a former corporal of the Gebirgsjäger who took part in the September 1943 mass murder of 120 Italian officers in Cephalonia, Greece, as part of the Massacre of the Acqui Division. He was convicted in absentia in 2013 by the military court of Rome and sentenced to life in prison, but Germany refused to extradite him. In 2021, it became known that he died on 28 October 2018.
Adolf Storms	Waffen-SS	SS-Unterscharführer	No/No	1920	28 June 2010 (Age 89–90)	Germany	Storms was an SS sergeant accused of taking part in the massacre of 60 Jewish forced laborers in Deutsch Schützen, Austria in March 1945. He worked as a train station manager after the war. In 2009, Storms was charged by a German court for his alleged participation in the massacre. He died in June 2010 in Duisburg at the age of 90 while awaiting trial.
Theodor Szehinskyj	SS-Totenkopfverbände	Camp guard	No/No	14 February 1924	2014 (Age 89–90)	United States	Szehinskyj served as a guard of the SS-Totenkopfverbände at the Gross-Rosen, Sachsenhausen and Warsaw concentration camps. He moved to the United States after the war and settled in West Chester, Pennsylvania. Szehinskyj had his U.S. citizenship revoked in 2000. He was ordered deported in 2003, but remained in the country until his death in 2014.
Herbert Wahler	Allgemeine SS ( Einsatzgruppe C)		No/No	10 December 1921	November 2023 (Age 101)	Germany	Wahler served in Einsatzgruppe C and was accused of being involved in the massacre of tens of thousands of Jews in Ukraine, including at Babi Yar. In March 2020, the public prosecutor's office in Kassel announced that Wahler would not face charges due to a lack of evidence.
Erna Wallisch	Aufseherin	Camp guard	No/No	10 February 1922	16 February 2008 (Age 86)	Austria	Wallisch was a guard at the Majdanek concentration camp and was accused of being involved in the murder of inmates. She had previously been a warden at Ravensbrück, and settled in Austria after the war. Investigations in the 1970s were dropped due to a lack of evidence, and Austrian authorities had declined to prosecute her, citing statute of limitations. The case was reopened in 2008 following new testimony from Poland. Wallisch died in Vienna in February 2008, aged 86.
Helmut Rasbol / X (unnamed)	Foreign volunteer		No/No	2 January 1925	15 January 2022 (Age 97)	Denmark	Born Helmuth Leif Rasmussen, Rasbol joined the Waffen-SS as a foreign volunteer following the German invasion of Denmark in 1940 and later served as a guard in the Judenlager ("Jewish camp") in Babruysk, Belarus, during 1942 and 1943, when 1,400 Jewish inmates were killed. In November 2016, the Danish chief prosecutor announced that Rasbol would not face charges due to a lack of evidence. He died on 15 January 2022.
Hubert Zafke	Waffen-SS	SS-Unterscharführer (medic)	Yes/No (deemed unfit to stand trial)	26 September 1920	5 July 2018 (Age 97)	Germany	Zafke served as a medic at Auschwitz during 1943 and 1944 and was charged with accessory to murder in 3,681 cases. Zafke's trial began in February 2016 but was repeatedly postponed due to his failing health, and in September 2017 he was eventually deemed unfit to stand trial due to dementia. Zafke died in 2018 at the age of 97.
Karoly (Charles) Zentai	Royal Hungarian Army	Warrant officer	No/No	8 October 1921	13 December 2017 (Age 96)	Australia	Zentai, a former Royal Hungarian Army soldier was accused of partaking in manhunts, persecution, and murder of Jews in Budapest in 1944, particularly of having beaten 18-year-old Péter Balázs to death for not wearing his Jewish yellow star ID. Zentai emigrated to Australia after the war. In 2005, Hungary issued an international arrest warrant against Zentai and requested his extradition. After a prolonged legal fight, the High Court of Australia ruled in 2012 that he could not be extradited, as the offense of "war crime" did not exist in Hungary in 1944. Zentai died in January 2018 in Perth at the age of 96.

== Never located alive ==
Name	Position	Date of birth	Date of death	Last known residence	Short summary
Petras Bernotavičius (Peter Bernes)	Unknown	79 in January 2002	Unknown	Lithuania	See also: History of the Jews of Kupiskis Bernatavicius was deputy to the Nazi-appointed mayor of Kupiškis, Lithuania, and was accused of organizing the killing of more than 1,000 Jews in Kupiškis in 1941. He moved to the United States after the war but fled to Lithuania in 2002, shortly before his US citizenship was revoked. Petras was not mentioned on the most wanted Nazi fugitive list when it was last updated in 2018.
Alois Brunner	Hauptsturmführer	8 April 1912	2001 (Age 88–89)	Syria	The former assistant of Adolf Eichmann, Brunner was responsible for the deportation of over 100,000 Jews to Nazi death camps in Eastern Europe. He fled Germany at the end of the war for Egypt, then Syria, where he lived for decades under Syrian protection and escaped multiple manhunts and investigations. Brunner was last seen in 2001 but his fate remained unconfirmed until 2014, when it was reported that he had died in Syria.
Aribert Heim	Hauptsturmführer	28 June 1914	10 August 1992 (Age 78)	Egypt	Heim was a doctor at the Sachsenhausen, Buchenwald and Mauthausen concentration camps. Known as "Dr. Death", Heim killed and tortured inmates at Mauthausen through various cruel methods. He fled Germany in 1962 when he was outed as a war criminal. Heim's whereabouts remained unclear, although in 2009 it was reported that he had been living in Egypt and had died in Cairo in 1992, which was confirmed by a court in Baden-Baden. The Simon Wiesenthal Center disputed the finding and Heim remained on Nazi fugitive list until 2013.
Y (unnamed)	Unknown	Unknown	Unknown	Germany	The unnamed person was accused of being accessory to the murder of Hungarian Jews in Auschwitz. They were not mentioned on the most wanted Nazi fugitive list when it was last updated in 2018.
Z (unnamed)	Unknown	Unknown	Unknown	Norway	The unnamed person was accused of murdering Jews in various locations in Poland and Ukraine. They were not mentioned on the most wanted Nazi fugitive list when it was last updated in 2018.

== See also ==
- List of last surviving World War II veterans
- Operation Last Chance
