= László Csatáry =

Hungarian Nazi collaborator (1915–2013)

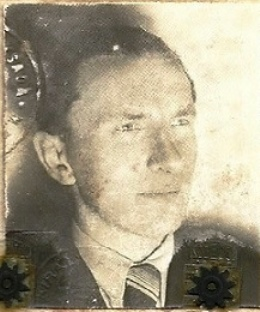
- László Csatáry in 1943 (aged 28)
- Born: 4 March 1915; Mány, Austria-Hungary
- Died: 10 August 2013 (aged 98); Budapest, Hungary
- Occupation: Art dealer
- Known for: Alleged war crimes

László Csizsik Csatáry (Hungarian: [ˈlaːsloː ˈt͡ʃɒtaːri]; 4 March 1915 – 10 August 2013) was a Hungarian citizen and was convicted and sentenced to death in absentia in 1948 by a Czechoslovak court as a Nazi war criminal. In 2012, his name was added to the Simon Wiesenthal Center's list of most wanted Nazi war criminals. He would soon afterwards be taken into custody and held under house arrest. In June 2013, he would finally be criminally charged by a Hungarian court, only to die two months later while awaiting trial.

== Life ==
Csatáry was born in Mány in 1915. In 1944 he was the Royal Hungarian Police assistant to the commander in the city of Kassa in Hungary (now Košice in Slovakia). He was accused of organizing the deportation of approximately 15,700 Jews to Auschwitz and of having inhumanely exercised his authority in a forced labor camp. He was also accused of brutalizing the inhabitants of the city.

He was convicted in absentia for war crimes in Czechoslovakia in 1948 and sentenced to death. He fled to Canada in 1949, claiming to be a Yugoslav national and settled in Montreal, where he became an art dealer. He became a Canadian citizen in 1955. In 1997, his Canadian citizenship was revoked by the federal Cabinet for lying on his citizenship application. He left the country two months later but was never charged with war crimes in Canada. An extensive criminal reference check was done on him with no evidence of war crimes there.

== Arrest and war-crimes indictment ==
In 2012, Csatáry was located in Budapest, Hungary, based on a tip received by the Simon Wiesenthal Center in September 2011.

His address was exposed by reporters from The Sun in July 2012. On 18 July 2012, Csatáry would be arrested by Hungarian authorities in Budapest. After being taken into custody by the Budapest Prosecution Office, Csatáry would then be held for questioning. Hungarian prosecutors would successfully manage to question him.

On 30 July 2012, Slovak Justice Minister Tomáš Borec announced that Slovakia was ready to prosecute against Csatáry and asked Hungary to extradite him.

A file prepared by the Simon Wiesenthal Center about Csatáry implicated him in the deportation of 300 people from Kassa in 1941. In August 2012 the Budapest Prosecutor's Office dropped the charges, saying Csatáry was not in Kassa at the time and lacked the rank to organize the transports. However, Csatáry was still under house arrest by September 2012. It was also reported that would he remain under house arrest pending the investigation against him for “extreme cruelty as a war-crime.” In January 2013 it was reported that Slovak police had found a witness to corroborate other charges relating to the deportation of 15,700 Jews from Kassa from May 1944.

Czechoslovakia had abolished capital punishment in 1990. Accordingly, on 28 March 2013, the Slovak County Court in Košice changed the 1948 verdict in Csatáry's case from death to life imprisonment.

On 18 June 2013, Hungarian prosecutors charged Csatáry with war crimes, saying he had abused Jews and helped to deport Jews to Auschwitz during World War II. A spokesperson for the Budapest Chief Prosecutor's Office said, "He is charged with the unlawful execution and torture of people, (thus) committing war crimes partly as a perpetrator, partly as an accomplice."

The Budapest higher court suspended his case on 8 July 2013, however, because "Csatáry had already been sentenced for the crimes included in the proceedings, in former Czechoslovakia in 1948". The court also added that it was necessary to examine how the 1948 death sentence could be applied to Hungarian legal practice. Despite this, Csatáry was still awaiting trial and facing charges which were related to his wartime activities in not only Hungary, but also Slovakia at the time of his death in August 2013.

== Reaction ==
László Karsai, a Hungarian Holocaust historian and the son of a Holocaust survivor, said:

"Csatáry was a small fish. I could name 2,000 people responsible for worse crimes than he was. The money spent hunting down people like him would be better spent fighting the propaganda of those who so energetically deny the Holocaust today."

— László Karsai

== Death ==
Csatáry died on 10 August 2013 from pneumonia at a hospital in Budapest, aged 98. According to daily Bors, Csatáry had been hospitalized for a long time, where he caught pneumonia. At the time of his death, Csatáry was still awaiting trial and facing charges in both Hungary and Slovakia which were related to his wartime activities at the Kassa-based internment camp he ran.

Efraim Zuroff, director of the Simon Wiesenthal Center stated that he was "deeply disappointed" that Csatáry had died without facing trial.

== See also ==
- Operation Last Chance
