= Formánek =

Formánek (feminine: Formánková) is a Czech surname. It is a diminutive of the word forman ('coachman') and the surname Forman. An Anglicised and Germanised form of the surname is Formanek. Its main distribution is in the Czech Republic and Austria. Notable people with the surname include:

- Bedrich Formánek (1933–2023), Slovak chess composer
- Edward W. Formanek (born 1942), American mathematician and chess player
- Gregor Formanek (1924–2025), Romanian-German Nazi soldier
- Josef Formánek (born 1969), Czech writer, journalist and traveller
- Michael Formanek (born 1958), American jazz musician
- Miroslav Formánek (born 1984), Slovak ski jumper
- René Formánek (born 1975), Czech footballer
