= Erna Wallisch =

Guard at Nazi concentration camp

- Born: Erna Pfannstiel; 10 February 1922; Benshausen, Germany
- Died: 16 February 2008 (aged 86)
- Occupation: Guard
- Known for: Seventh on the Simon Wiesenthal Center's list of most wanted war criminals that had never been convicted.

Erna Wallisch (née Pfannstiel, 10 February 1922 – 16 February 2008) was a female guard in two Nazi concentration camps, but despite several trials was never convicted. In 2007, she was seventh on the Simon Wiesenthal Center's list of most wanted war criminals that had never been convicted.

== Early life ==
Wallisch was born Erna Pfannstiel in Benshausen, in Thuringia in 1922. Her father was a postal clerk and her mother was a housewife. Erna worked as a maid in Berlin for a year before joining the NSDAP at the age of 19 and undergoing training to become an Aufseherin, or female concentration camp guard.

== World War II ==
Wallisch first served as a guard at Ravensbrück concentration camp for a year before she was transferred to the Majdanek concentration camp in Lublin, Poland in May 1941. While in service at Majdanek, she met a Nazi guard named Georg Wallisch, and married him in 1944. It is alleged that she was a brutal guard, beating women and children on their way to the gas chambers and personally participated in the selections of inmates to be executed.

Survivors described pregnant Wallisch beating a young boy to death and have referred to her as "the pregnant monster". One of the survivors, Jadwiga Landowska, has said: "The pregnant Nazi monster woman who went crazy and attacked us did not appear among those tried in Duesseldorf after the war. The pregnant one hit a young boy lying on the floor with something harder than a whip. Blood was pouring from his head and he gave no sign of life or reaction. The sweating, breathless face of that monster was something I will never forget." Another has claimed that she used "violence and illegal threats for reasons of race and nationality, against women and children weakened physically and psychologically... she treated them in an inhumane way".

== Legal ==
There were three attempts to prosecute Wallisch:

1965: In Graz, charges were dismissed due to "insufficient evidence".

1970s: In Vienna, but the prosecutor was unwilling to pursue (nolle prosequi), as the Austrian statutes of limitation had expired. It was found that she was "a possible participant in sadistic activities but not a perpetrator" and that she had "distant guilt."

2005: Historian Dr Efraim Zuroff urged the Austrian Department of Justice to prosecute anew, but its speaker, Christoph Pöchinger declared that there was lack of credible evidence. This was despite how Zuroff had identified five Polish survivors who were prepared to testify against her. This unwillingness to prosecute led the Simon Wiesenthal Center to put her on the list of most wanted war criminals, ranked at number seven.

== Post-World War II ==
In 2007, British author and journalist Guy Walters tracked Wallisch down to a small flat in the district of Kaisermühlen in Vienna, Austria, as part of his research for an upcoming work titled Hunting Evil: How the Nazi War Criminals Escaped and the Hunt to Bring Them to Justice, about the pursuit of escaped Nazi war criminals.

Though Wallisch would not talk to Walters and the Austrian government claimed that the statute of limitations had expired on her war crimes, Poland explored seeking an indictment against her. Though they had investigated Wallisch for her crimes in the 1970s, the renewed interest as well as evidence from Polish survivors, lead Austrian officials to commission a report on the crimes which had taken place six decades earlier. Before the report could be completed, the 86-year-old Wallisch died in hospital.

== See also ==
- Female guards in Nazi concentration camps
