= Samuel Kunz =

Russian-German Nazi guard (1921–2010)

Samuel Kunz (August 1921, in Russia – November 18, 2010, in Wachtberg near Bonn, Germany) was a Russian-German guard in the extermination camp Belzec and alleged Nazi war criminal.

== Life ==
Samuel Kunz was born on August 21, 1921, in Russia. Though an ethnic German, he served initially in the Soviet Red Army. After having been captured by the German Wehrmacht, he was given the choice to stay at the Chelm prisoner war camp or to cooperate with the Germans. Kunz chose to work with the Nazis and was sent to Trawniki, an SS training camp. There he met John Demjanjuk. After his training, Samuel Kunz was sent to Belzec extermination camp as a camp guard from January 1942 to July 1943. When the Nazis closed the Belzec camp, Kunz was transferred to the Flossenburg concentration camp where he remained until the liberation by the Allies. Kunz, who lived in Germany after the end of the Second World War, worked as a carpenter for the Federal Ministry for Regional Planning, Construction and Urban Development (today: Federal Ministry for the Interior, Building and Community) and received German citizenship. The Bonn Regional Court declared on 21 November 2010 that Samuel Kunz died on 18 November 2010 in his house in the Rhein-Sieg area near Bonn without giving details about the causes of his death. The Public Prosecutor's Office Bonn was conducting a death investigation because of unclear death causes. He died shortly before the first day of the trial, allegedly suffering from heart failure. The autopsy of the corpse, however, resulted in death by hypothermia. Kunz was 89 years old.

== War crimes ==
Kunz was captured by American troops and, beginning in the 1960s, he testified in the trials of Nazi war criminals. "We knew that Jews were being killed and we knew they were being burned," he stated at one trial. "We could smell it every day." Kunz’s alleged Nazi past was revealed by several media outlets in connection with the Demjanjuk trial where he was called as a witness. After all the Dortmund prosecutor’s office started an investigation into the allegations, whereas Kunz allegedly aided the murder of 430,000 people. He had admitted in several interrogations his past as a member of the SS but denied having been involved in individual shootings. He was ranked third on the list of the most-wanted Nazi war criminals worldwide at the Simon Wiesenthal Center. The following procedural matters should have been negotiated in the trial against Kunz:

- Aiding the murder of 430,000 people in the Belzec extermination camp
- Self-handed murder of eight people
- The assassination of two people

== Legal procedure ==
Kunz had been long ignored by the German justice system, with authorities in the past showing little interest in going after relatively low-ranking camp guards. Efraim Zuroff, former director of the Simon Wiesenthal Center in Jerusalem said in regard to the death of Kunz: "The fact that Kunz was able to live unpunished in Germany for decades is the result of a flawed investigative strategy that spared virtually every Holocaust offender who was not an officer".

== In literature ==
"Since the stink in the summer was no longer bearable, the method of burning bodies on pyres was adopted" - Testimony of Samuel Kunz. The Nazi Hunter, Alan Elsner
