= Erich Naumann =

German SS general and war criminal (1905–1951)

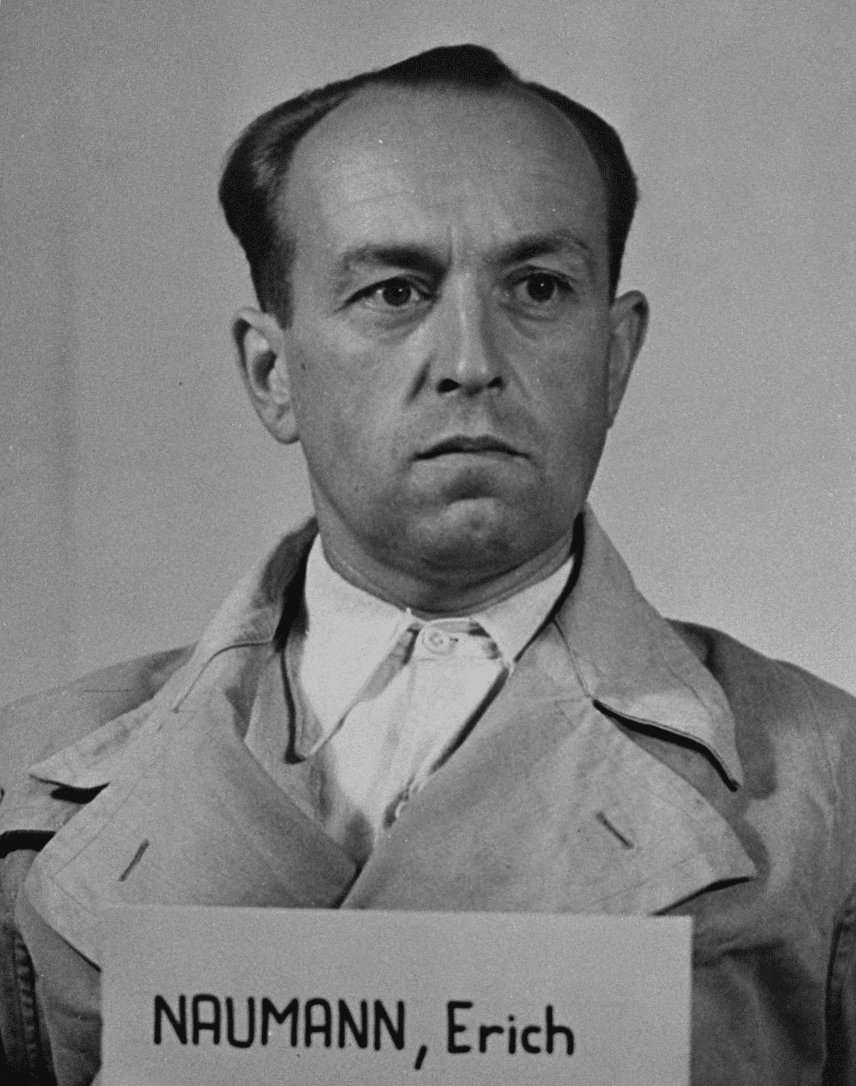
- Naumann's mugshot after his indictment for the Nuremberg Military Tribunal (July 1947)
- Born: 29 April 1905; Meissen, Saxony, German Empire
- Died: 7 June 1951 (aged 46); Landsberg Prison, Landsberg am Lech, West Germany
- Status: Executed by hanging
- Motive: Nazism
- Convictions: Crimes against humanity War crimes Membership in a criminal organization
- Trial: Einsatzgruppen trial
- Penalty: Death

Details
- Victims: 95,000+
- Span of crimes: 1939–1944
- Country: Poland, Belarusian SSR, Russian SFSR, and Netherlands
- SS career
- Allegiance: Nazi Germany
- Branch: Schutzstaffel
- Rank: SS-Brigadeführer
- Commands: Einsatzgruppe VI; Einsatzgruppe B; Commander of the Security Police and SD in the Netherlands

Erich Naumann (29 April 1905 – 7 June 1951) was an SS-Brigadeführer and member of the SD. Naumann had a key role in the Holocaust in Eastern Europe as the commander of Einsatzgruppe VI and the commander of Einsatzgruppe B. A convicted war criminal, Naumann was sentenced to death and hanged on 7 June 1951.

He was married to Elisabeth Hauptvogel since 18 July 1928. They had one son, Wolfram Naumann, born 2 September 1931.

== Early life and career ==
Born 29 April 1905, in Meissen, Saxony, Erich Naumann left school at the age of sixteen and was employed in a commercial firm in his home town of Meissen. He joined the Nazi Party in November 1929 (nr. 170257). In 1933, Naumann joined the SA in a full-time capacity and then became an official and officer of police. He joined the Sicherheitsdienst (SD) in 1935. Naumann was the commander of Einsatzgruppe VI during its short-lived existence. During the invasion of Poland, the unit murdered over 6,000 people as part of Operation Tannenberg. Afterwards, Naumann was Chief of Einsatzgruppe B from November 1941 until February or March 1943.

During November 1941, reports he sent to Adolf Eichmann state that he was responsible for the deaths of 17,256 people in Smolensk. Under his command, he admitted that his Einsatzgruppe possessed three gas vans which "were used to exterminate human beings". In another report, dated 15 December 1942, Naumann reported that the Einsatzgruppe B had shot a total of 134,298 people.

From September 1943 to July 1944, Naumann was the Befehlshaber der Sicherheitspolizei und des SD (Commander of the Security Police and SD) in the occupied Netherlands. In this position, he assisted the perpetrators of Operation Silbertanne and approved of executions carried out by Henk Feldmeijer and Feldmeijer's death squad.

== War crimes trial and execution ==
After capture by the Allies, Naumann stood trial in front of a U.S. military court during the Einsatzgruppen trial. During the proceedings he repeatedly stated that he did not consider his actions during his tenure as commanding officer of Einsatzgruppe B wrong. When asked on the witness stand whether he saw anything morally wrong about the Führer's orders, he replied: "No, your Honor, I considered the decree to be right, because it was part of our aim of the war and therefore it was necessary." The tribunal asked Naumann to clarify, "Then the Tribunal will accept from your answer that you saw nothing wrong with the order, even though it did involve the killing of defenseless human beings. That is what we draw from your answer." Naumann replied, "Yes, your Honor." Naumann was found guilty of war crimes, crimes against humanity, and membership in a criminal organization, namely the SS and the SD. Naumann was sentenced to death and hanged shortly after midnight on 7 June 1951.
