= Furchner =

Furchner is a German surname. Notable people with the surname include:

- Irmgard Furchner (1925–2025), German convicted concentration camp secretary
- Sebastian Furchner (born 1982), German ice hockey player
