= Helma Kissner =

German alleged war criminal (1923–2019)

- Born: 22 December 1923; Sensburg, East Prussia, Germany
- Died: 7 September 2019 (aged 95)
- Military career
- Allegiance: Germany
- Branch: Waffen-SS
- Conflicts: World War II; Auschwitz-Birkenau; Natzweiler-Struthof concentration camp

Helma Kissner (22 December 1923 – 7 September 2019), later known as Helma Maaß, was a German Waffen-SS officer who served during World War II, serving in the Auschwitz-Birkenau and Natzweiler-Struthof concentration camps. In 2016, she was ranked 1st on the list of most-wanted Nazi war criminals as determined by the Simon Wiesenthal Center.

== Biography ==
Kissner was born in Sensburg, East Prussia, as the daughter of a carpenter and housewife. She had two sisters, one of whom died shortly before the end of World War II. In 1934, she joined the League of German Girls, and in 1941 she joined the Nazi Party. During World War II, as a radio operator, Kissner was associated with the German Labour Front and the Waffen-SS. From 21 April to 7 July 1944, she was a radio operator at the Auschwitz-Birkenau concentration camp, where, due to her function, she had access to many confidential official documents. Then, until the end of the war, she served in Natzweiler-Struthof in Alsace. After the war, Kissner was interned until 18 July 1948.

In 2015, the German prosecutor's office planned to bring her to trial, accusing her of aiding in the murder of at least 266,390 people during her service in Auschwitz-Birkenau. On 9 September 2016, however, she was found unfit to stand trial by a court in Kiel due to illness. Kissner died on 7 September 2019, at the age of 95 (though this would not be publicly reported until June 2025).
