= Klaas Carel Faber =

Dutch-German war criminal

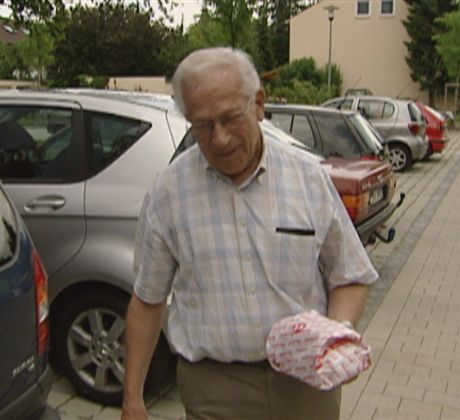
- Born: 20 January 1922; Haarlem, Netherlands
- Died: 24 May 2012 (aged 90); Ingolstadt, Germany
- Military career
- Allegiance: Nazi Germany
- Branch: Sicherheitsdienst
- Service years: 1940–1945
- Conflicts: World War II

Klaas Carel Faber (20 January 1922 – 24 May 2012) was a convicted Dutch-German war criminal. He was the son of Pieter and Carolina Josephine Henriëtte (née Bakker) Faber, and the brother of Pieter Johan Faber, who was executed for war crimes in 1948. Faber was on the Simon Wiesenthal Center's list of most wanted Nazi war criminals. Faber died in Germany in May 2012, having never been extradited.

== Second World War ==
Faber was born in Haarlem, The Netherlands, to a family with a strong Nazi background. Like his father and his brother, Faber was a member of the National Socialist Movement, or NSB, before the war, and joined the Waffen SS a month after the German occupation of the Netherlands in 1940. After five months, he abandoned military training for less demanding police jobs in Rotterdam and The Hague.

In May 1943, he became a German citizen with the passing of the Erlaß über den Erwerb der deutschen Staatsangehörigkeit durch Einstellung in die deutsche Wehrmacht, die Waffen-SS, die deutsche Polizei oder die Organisation Todt vom 11. Mai 1943 (RGBl. I. S. 315), which automatically awarded citizenship to all foreign members of the Waffen-SS and other organizations. From 1943 to 1944, he was a commander of a firing squad at the Westerbork concentration camp, the camp Anne Frank passed through on her way to her death at Belsen. His zeal increased after his father, Pieter Faber, a baker at Heemstede, was killed by Hannie Schaft of the Dutch resistance on 8 June 1944. He participated in the SS's Silbertanne ("Silver Fir") death squad which targeted members of the Dutch resistance, and those who hid Jews and opposed Nazism. He was also a member of Sonderkommando Feldmeijer, which carried out arbitrary assassinations (more than 50; his brother and Heinrich Boere were members of the same squad) of prominent Dutch citizens in reprisal for Resistance activities, and served as a bodyguard to Dutch Nazi leader Anton Mussert.

== Post-war ==
After the war, Faber was tried by a Dutch court and sentenced to death by firing squad on 9 June 1947, for the murder of 11 persons in Westerbork and 11 others. The Dutch court stated that the Faber brothers were "two of the worst criminals of the SS". Pieter Faber was executed in 1948. On 14 January 1948, Faber's sentence was commuted to life imprisonment. However, on 26 December 1952, he escaped from prison in Breda, with Herbertus Bikker, Sander Borgers and four other former members of the Dutch SS, and that same evening crossed the border into Germany. The escape may have been masterminded by the Stichting Oud Politieke Delinquenten, an organisation of former Dutch fascists and collaborators. As a former member of the SS, Faber had obtained German citizenship. Following his escape Faber went on to live in the Bavarian city of Ingolstadt and until retirement worked for the car manufacturer Audi as an office clerk.

== Extradition requests ==
In 1957, a German court in Düsseldorf dismissed charges against him for lack of evidence, claiming the Dutch authorities would not share evidence. Two extradition requests were made by the Dutch in 1954 and 2004 to have Faber returned to complete his sentence. Both requests were denied by the German authorities, the second with reference to the 1957 decision of lack of evidence. When new evidence was presented to a Munich court in 2006, the cases were viewed as manslaughter as opposed to murder, and thus outside the statute of limitations. A new arrest warrant from Dutch authorities was required to reopen the case, which was issued in part because of the attention brought to the case by Dutch journalist Arnold Karskens, who in 2003 had found Faber's residence. Calls for his extradition were frequent, including at the 2007 commemoration of the first transport that left Westerbork for the destruction camps.

In April 2009 Faber was listed by the Simon Wiesenthal Center as one of the most important Nazi era war criminals still at large. The center noted that he was a member of the Sonderkommando Feldmeijer execution squad. In July 2009 it was reported that at the time the German government might have wanted to prosecute Faber after all while other reports stated that he enjoyed immunity from prosecution. In August 2010, following the petition of more than 150 lawyers organized by Jerusalem-based lawyer David Schonberg, the Israeli government demanded that Germany enforce Faber's sentence or extradite him to the Netherlands, and change its policy of allowing Nazi war crimes suspects to escape prosecution. Israel's justice minister, Ya'akov Ne'eman, wrote to the German justice minister, Sabine Leutheusser-Schnarrenberger, asking that justice be carried out.

In November 2010, the Netherlands issued a European Arrest Warrant for Faber, the first the country ever issued for a war criminal. The application questioned the legality of Faber's German citizenship given because of his membership in the SS. A Justice official from Bavarian justice stated that the request would be considered, "but as far as I know, there is nothing new".

In January 2012 the German Justice department requested the judiciary in Ingolstadt, after pressure from the Dutch government, to execute the life sentence of the war criminal. Faber died before the request was granted. The many extradition requests and other investigations also called into question various administrative decisions regarding the Faber case; in 2012, Dutch historian Jan de Roos filed a suit against the Dutch government regarding their decision to not release correspondence between it and the German government about Faber. In 2012 a protest, organised by Dutch anti-fascist Arthur Graaff, was held against a visit of the then German president Gauck to the Dutch town of Breda was named 'Gauck nicht, Faber wohl' (nach Holland) ('Not Gauck, but Faber' (to Holland)).

== Death ==
Faber died on 24 May 2012 from kidney failure in Ingolstadt.

== See also ==
- Dutch collaboration
- Dutch resistance
