= Operation Silbertanne =

Codename of a series of executions

Operation Silbertanne (silver fir) was the code name of executions that were committed between September 1943 and September 1944 during the German occupation of the Netherlands. The executions were carried out by a death squad composed of Nederlandsche SS (Dutch members of the SS) and Dutch veterans of the Eastern Front.

== Background ==
After Adolf Hitler approved Anton Mussert as Leider van het Nederlandse Volk (Leader of the Dutch People) in December 1942, he was allowed to form a national government institute, a Dutch shadow cabinet called 'Gemachtigden van den Leider', which advised Reichskommissar Arthur Seyss-Inquart from 1 February 1943. The institute consisted of a number of deputies in charge of defined functions or departments within the administration.

On 4 February 1943, Retired General and Rijkscommissaris Hendrik Seyffardt, already head of the Dutch SS volunteer group Vrijwilligerslegioen Nederland, was announced through the press as "Deputy for Special Services". As a result, the Communist resistance group CS-6 (Dr. Gerrit Kastein) named after its address, 6 Corelli Street, in Amsterdam, concluded that the new institute would eventually lead to a National-Socialist government, which would then introduce general conscription to enable the call-up of Dutch nationals to the Eastern Front. The Nazis only saw Mussert and the NSB as a useful Dutch tool to enable general co-operation and Seyss-Inquart had assured Mussert after his December 1942 meeting with Hitler, that general conscription was not on the agenda. CS-6 thought that Seyffardt was the most important person within the new institute who was eligible for an attack, after the heavily-protected Mussert.

After approval from the Dutch government in exile in London, on the evening of Friday 5 February 1943, after answering a knock at his front door in Scheveningen, The Hague, Seyffardt was shot twice by student Jan Verleun who had accompanied Dr. Kastein on the mission. A day later Seyffardt succumbed to his injuries in hospital. A private military ceremony was arranged at the Binnenhof, attended by family and friends and with Mussert in attendance, after which Seyffardt was cremated. On 7 February, CS-6 shot fellow institute member Gemachtigde voor de Volksvoorlichting (Attorney for the national relations) Hermannus Reydon and his wife. His wife died on the spot, while Reydon died on 24 August of his injuries. The gun used in this attack had been given to Dr. Kastein by Sicherheitsdienst (SD) agent Anton van der Waals, who after tracking him back through information, arrested him on 19 February. Two days later Dr. Kastein committed suicide so as not to give away Dutch Resistance information under torture.

== Activity ==
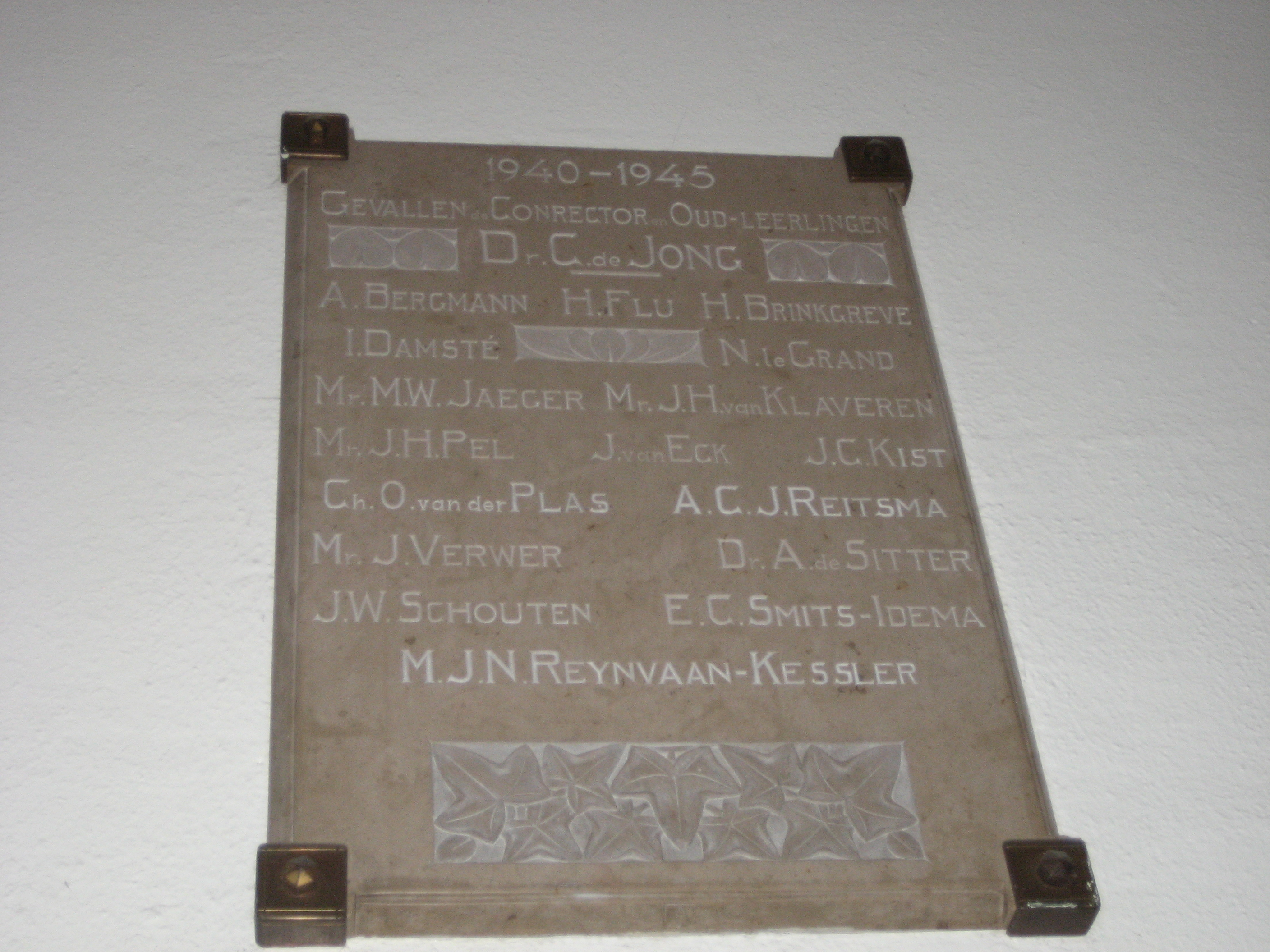
Plaque in Stedelijk Gymnasium Leiden to commemorate teachers and pupils who died in World War II. One of them was Operation Silbertanne victim Christiaan de Jong.

Seyffardt and Reydon's deaths led to massive German reprisals in the occupied Netherlands, under Unternehmen Silbertanne, supported by various German officers. Silbertanne was intended as reprisal for the attacks made on predominantly Dutch collaborators and German occupational forces by the Dutch resistance. The SS General for the Netherlands, Hanns Albin Rauter, gave order to retaliate by assassinating civilians presumed to be connected to the resistance or to be orange-minded, meaning Dutch patriots, or anti-German. The task of perpetrating the killings was first assigned to specially-formed death squads, though killings were later carried out exclusively by Sonderkommando Feldmeijer a special unit consisting of 15 SS-members.

Rauter immediately ordered the murder of 50 Dutch hostages and a series of raids on Dutch universities. Later in the war, the Dutch resistance attacked Rauter's car (6 March 1945) that led to reprisal killings at De Woeste Hoeve, where 117 men were rounded up and executed at the site of the ambush, and another 147 Gestapo prisoners executed elsewhere.

The first killings took place in autumn 1943 in Meppel and Staphorst, and within a year more than 54 Dutchmen had been murdered or severely wounded. On 1–2 October 1944, in the village of Putten, over 600 men were deported to camps to be killed in retaliation for resistance activity in the Putten raid. Some of the most notorious Dutch war criminals participated in Silbertanne: Heinrich Boere, Maarten Kuiper, Sander Borgers, Klaas Carel Faber, his brother Pieter Johan Faber, Daniel Bernard (war criminal), Willy Lages and Lambertus van Gog.

One of the most prominent victims of Silbertanne was Dutch writer A. M. de Jong, who was killed in October 1943.

Mussert was opposed to Silbertanne, and when in autumn 1944 SS Brigadeführer Karl Eberhard Schöngarth, head of SiPo and the Sicherheitsdienst (SD) was informed of these retaliatory killings he had them terminated in September 1944. The commander of the Security Police and SD in the Netherlands, Erich Naumann, assisted the perpetrators of Silbertanne. He approved of executions carried out by Feldmeijer and Feldmeijer's death squad.

== Prosecution ==
After the war, some of the members of the death squad and those responsible for giving the orders were put on trial. The commander, Henk Feldmeijer, had been killed on 22 January 1945, when his car was strafed by an Allied aircraft.

Maarten Kuiper and Pieter Johan Faber were executed in 1948. Hanns Albin Rauter was executed in 1949. Others managed to flee the country and went into hiding. Sander Borgers died in 1985 at the age of 67 in Haren, Germany. Klaas Carel Faber lived until his death on May 24, 2012, in the Bavarian city of Ingolstadt. In July 2009 it was reported that the German government wanted to prosecute Faber after all. Daniel Bernhard died in 1962. Lambertus van Gog fled to Spain but was extradited to the Netherlands in 1978. Heinrich Boere, who has been living for decades in Germany, was found fit to stand trial for the murders committed between 1943 and 1944, by the Provincial Court of Appeal in Cologne on 7 July 2009 and was found guilty and sentenced to life in prison in March 2010. Boere died in a prison hospital on December 1, 2013.

In 1947, Erich Naumann was a defendant of the Einsatzgruppen trial. In 1948, he was found guilty of unrelated atrocities during his time as an Einsatzgruppen commander in Belarus and sentenced to death. He was executed by hanging at Landsberg Prison in 1951.

== See also ==
- Dutch collaboration
- Dutch resistance
