= Benshausen =

- Ortsteil of Zella-Mehlis
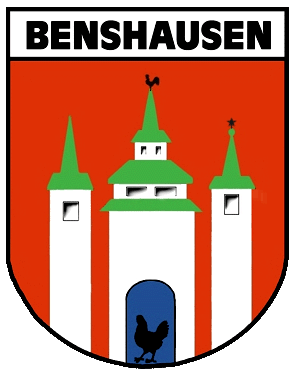
- Coat of arms
- Interactive map of Benshausen
- Location within Germany Location within Thuringia
- Coordinates: 50°39′N 10°36′E
- Country: Germany
- State: Thuringia
- District: Schmalkalden-Meiningen
- Town: Zella-Mehlis

Area
  - Total: 24.92 km^{2} (9.62 sq mi)
- Elevation: 400 m (1,300 ft)

Population (2017-12-31)
  - Total: 2,333
  - Density: 93.62/km^{2} (242.5/sq mi)
- Time zone: UTC+01:00 (CET)
  - Summer (DST): UTC+02:00 (CEST)
- Postal codes: 98554
- Dialling codes: 036843
- Vehicle registration: SM
- Website: www.benshausen.de

Benshausen (German pronunciation: [bɛnsˈhaʊzn̩]) is a village and a former municipality in the district Schmalkalden-Meiningen, in Thuringia, Germany. Since 1 January 2019, it is part of the town Zella-Mehlis.

== Notable people ==
- Johann Daniel Elster
- Walter Keiner
- Otto Kürschner
- Erna Wallisch
