= Rūta Vanagaitė =

Lithuanian critic and writer (born 1955)

- Born: January 25, 1955 (age 71); Šiauliai, Lithuanian Soviet Socialist Republic, Soviet Union (now Lithuania)
- Citizenship: Lithuanian
- Education: Russian Institute of Theatre Arts
- Occupations: public figure, theatre critic, writer, journalist

Rūta Vanagaitė (born January 25, 1955) is a public figure in Lithuania, who is also a theatre critic, writer, and journalist.

She is controversial for her comments in 2017 about the Lithuanian anti-Soviet resistance leader Adolfas Ramanauskas, where she claimed that he was not a hero and that his wounds, which included his genitals, were not the result of interrogation by the KGB, but self-inflicted. She later retracted her statements and admitted herself that they were baseless.

== Biography ==
Vanagaitė was born on January 25, 1955, in Šiauliai. From 1961 to 1972 she studied in secondary school no. 22 in Vilnius.

In 1978 she graduated from the Russian Institute of Theatre Arts where she studied drama, and began publishing her theatre review articles before graduation. In 1978 she was appointed head of the theatre, cinema and TV section in Kultūros barai monthly magazine, and later worked at the Literatūra ir menas newspaper. From 1985 to 1989, she lived in Helsinki where she worked in the library of the University of Helsinki and wrote articles on social and cultural topics for Helsingin Sanomat newspaper.

=== 1989– ===
In 1989, she returned to Lithuania and became the art director of the National Youth Theatre. Since 1991 she was organizing annually the international theatre festival LIFE. In 1999—2001 she was an advisor to prime minister Rolandas Paksas on culture and communication. In 2001 she founded a public relations agency Acta Publica. Since 2006, she is a director of Vilko valia agency.

In 2015, she met Efraim Zuroff who discussed with her the extermination of the Lithuanian Jews during the Holocaust. This was the beginning of her work on writing the book Mūsiškiai. Kelionė su priešu (Our People. A Journey with the Enemy), which was published a year later, and was translated into multiple languages (English, Polish, Russian, Hebrew). The book discusses the problem of participation of common Lithuanians in the execution of Jews and robbing of their property. She claims to have been shunned by some of her relatives and friends after the publication of the book.

She self published a book in cooperation with German historian Christoph Dieckmann about the Holocaust with the English title How Did It Happen?. The English edition was published by Rowman & Littlefield Publishers in 2021.

Apart from her native Lithuanian, she is fluent in Russian, English, Finnish, Polish Hebrew and French.

=== False claims about A. Ramanauskas–Vanagas ("The Hawk") ===
Vanagaitė made false allegations against the leader of Lithuanian partisans Adolfas Ramanauskas (nicknamed "The Hawk") . A week after her initial statements, Vanagaitė issued an apology for having made "utterly misleading claims" based on KGB case files that relied on torture. She said she had been unaware of all the facts. His KGB file contained information that in his last speech he hailed the USSR, that he had self-injured, punctured his own eye and cut his own genitals. Vanagaitė further claimed he was a KGB agent. The claims were supported by her partner Efraim Zuroff, who accused Ramanauskas of taking part in the Holocaust in Lithuania, based on information he had found in the diaries of his main persecutor and torturer Nachman Dushanski.

Her claims were discredited by numerous Lithuanian historians and public figures as having been based on false confessions made under brutal torture, condition of coma, at some moments even physically unable to write his signature. Ramanauskas' biographer, historian Arvydas Anušauskas, observed dismissively that it's "no surprise to hear such claims from a person who has never researched history", is unaware of how such cases are made, how they're falsified and censured to fit the dictatorial regime. Vanagaitė's publisher Alma littera withdrew her book from the market. The Lithuanian General Attorney's office also started an investigation but found "no evidence that Vanagaitė intentionally spread false claims, therefore the false claims should be assessed in ethical and not legal terms". The Lithuanian Jewish Community implicitly accepted that the claims were false when they announced they had no problem with a monument for The Hawk. The ambassador of Israel Amir Maimon visited Ramanauskas' daughter Auksutė Ramanauskaitė-Skokauskienė in 2017, reassuring her that Israel respects the Lithuanian fight for freedom and that the attacks by two people are "purely their personal [opinions]".

== Books ==
- Ne bobų vasara. Vilnius: Alma littera, 2013. — 168 p., 2015. — 166 p.
- Pareigos metas. Vilnius: Alma littera, 2014. — 300 p.
- Jis. Vilnius: Alma littera, 2016. — 240 p.
- Ne bobų reikalai , 2017
- Višta strimelės galva ("A Chicken with Herring's Head"), Alma littera, 2017, a biographical book; withdrawn from circulation by the publisher
- Mūsiškiai (co-authored with Efraim Zuroff) – translated: Our People (English), Nasi (Polish)
- Kaip tai įvyko? Christoph Dieckmann atsako Rūtai Vanagaitei ["How Did It Happen? Christoph Dieckmann answers to Rūta Vanagaitė"]. 2020 Renkuosi vasarą. 2021
  - English translation: How Did It Happen?: Understanding the Holocaust, 2021
- Lukiškės: Tamsioji Vilniaus pusė
- Renkuosi vasarą, 2021
