= Hans Lipschis =

- Born: Antanas Lipšys; 7 November 1919; Kretinga, Lithuania
- Died: 16 June 2016 (aged 96); Aalen, Germany
- Known for: Alleged Nazi war crimes

Hans Lipschis (7 November 1919 – 16 June 2016) was a member of the SS who worked at Auschwitz concentration camp during World War II.

== Biography ==
The Simon Wiesenthal Center alleges that he was a guard and listed him in fourth place on their most wanted list. At the age of 93, Lipschis was arrested on 6 May 2013 for being complicit in murder. He was held in jail until December 2013. Lipschis claimed that while he worked at Auschwitz, he was only a cook. He was found to be unfit for trial in December 2013 and March 2014. The prosecution from Stuttgart, Germany, has created virtual Auschwitz to reveal what was visible from watchtowers. To secure convictions, the prosecutors are using a mixture of testimonies and archived paperwork alongside modern techniques, including 3D modeling.

Lipschis was born Antanas Lipšys in Lithuania in 1919 to a Protestant family. In the 1950s he immigrated to Chicago in the United States, but was deported in 1983 for "lying about his Nazi past". At the time of his arrest, Lipschis lived in an apartment in the southwestern German town of Aalen.
