= Herbert Wahler =

Nazi German Einsatzgruppe soldier (1921–2023)

- Born: 10 December 1921
- Died: November 2023 (aged 101); Melsungen, Germany
- Military career
- Allegiance: Germany
- Branch: Einsatzgruppen; Einsatzgruppe C
- Conflicts: World War II; Babi Yar massacre

Herbert Wahler (10 December 1921 – November 2023) was a German who served in Einsatzgruppe C and was accused of being involved in the massacre of tens of thousands of Jews in Ukraine, including at Babi Yar. He was included in the list of most-wanted Nazi war criminals in 2018.

In March 2020, the public prosecutor's office in Kassel announced that Wahler would not face charges due to a lack of evidence. He turned 100 in December 2021. As of 2021, he was suspected to be the last living member of Einsatzgruppe C. Wahler died in Melsungen in November 2023, at the age of 101.

== See also ==
- List of last surviving Nazi war criminals
