= Otto Kürschner =

German cyclist

Personal information
- Born: 29 April 1904 Benshausen, Province of Saxony, Prussia, German Empire
- Died: 31 January 1964 (aged 59) Benshausen, East Germany

Cycling career
- Sport: Cycling

Otto Kürschner (29 April 1904 – 31 January 1964) was a German cyclist. He competed in the individual road race at the 1928 Summer Olympics.
