= Johann Daniel Elster =

German composer and choir director (1796–1857)

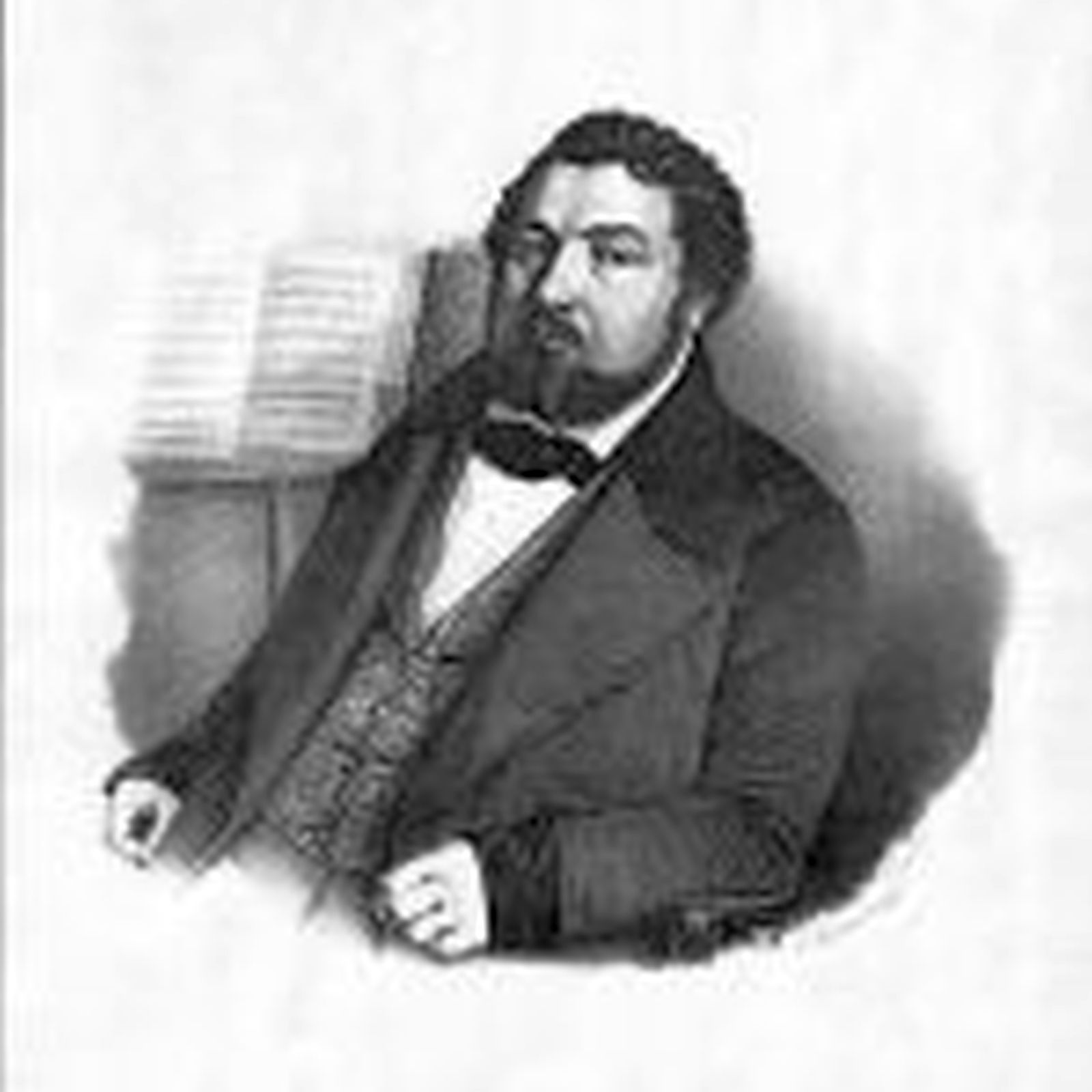
Johann Daniel Elster

Johann Daniel Elster (16 September 1796 – 19 December 1857) was a German music professor and choirmaster.

== Life ==
Johann Daniel Elster was born on 16 September 1796 in Benshausen, Thuringia. He was the son of a hammer smith. He received his first music lessons in his hometown. In 1809, Elster attended grammar school in Freiberg, Saxony.

Elster also studied theology in Leipzig and in 1816 was a member of the "Corps compatriot Franconia Leipzig". He continued his studies in Jena, but later moved to South America and joined Simón Bolívar's liberation movement. He later returned to Europe and moved to Würzburg where he continued his studies. Early 1822 he travelled to Greece with other Philhellenes to fight with the Greeks in the Greek War of Independence. He took part in the bloody Battle of Peta (July 1822) where many Philhellenes were killed.

In 1823 he moved to Basel through Smyrna and France, and gained his first job as a piano teacher. Shortly thereafter, he received an appointment to the Lenzburg teacher training institute. He received a teaching post in Baden in 1825 and in 1826 founded the first Baden male choir. In 1827, after learning of his father's death, he moved back home.

In 1834 Elster began to complete the opera Richard und Blondel, which premiered in December 1835 at the Meininger Theater. In 1839 he received a job as a theatre bandmaster in Zurich. He died on 19 December 1857 in Wettingen from a liver disease.

=== Works ===
- Das Bataillon der Philhellenen: dessen Errichtung, Feldzug und Untergang. Baden, 1828.
- "Die Irrfahrten des Daniel Elster, vols. 1 & 2"
