= Theodor Szehinskyj =

Ukrainian SS soldier (1924–2014)

Theodor Szehinskyj (February 14, 1924 – 2014) was an alleged World War II war criminal. He was born in Mallnow, Poland. He was a member of an SS Totenkopf Battalion and is accused of having been a guard in three concentration camps in Germany, Poland and Ukraine. Szehinskyj emigrated to the United States after the war, but was named as a war criminal by the United States Department of Justice in 2000, subsequently had his citizenship revoked, and faced attempts to deport him from the country. He was on the Simon Wiesenthal Center's list of most wanted Nazi war criminals.

The Szehinskyj family were Ukrainians resident in Poland. Fluent in both Polish and Ukrainian, he grew up on his parents' farm in Mallnow and worked there after completing seven grades of school. After the Soviets occupied Mallnow during World War II and collectivized agriculture, he left his farm and moved to Lviv, where he was captured by the Germans in early 1942. He was transported to Vienna and worked intermittently on a farm in Austria. From 1943 to early 1945, he allegedly served in the Waffen-SS belonging SS Totenkopf Division in the concentration camps of Gross-Rosen, Sachsenhausen and Warsaw. He was allegedly involved in the transport of prisoners from the Sachsenhausen concentration camp in Mauthausen concentration camp shortly before the war ended in 1945. In 1950, Szehinskyj emigrated with his wife and daughter to the United States and worked as a machinist for General Electric. His US citizenship was revoked in 2000. He was ordered deported in 2003, but remained in the United States until his death in 2014.
