= Henk Feldmeijer =

Dutch Nazi politician and a member of the NSB Feldmeijer (1910–1945)

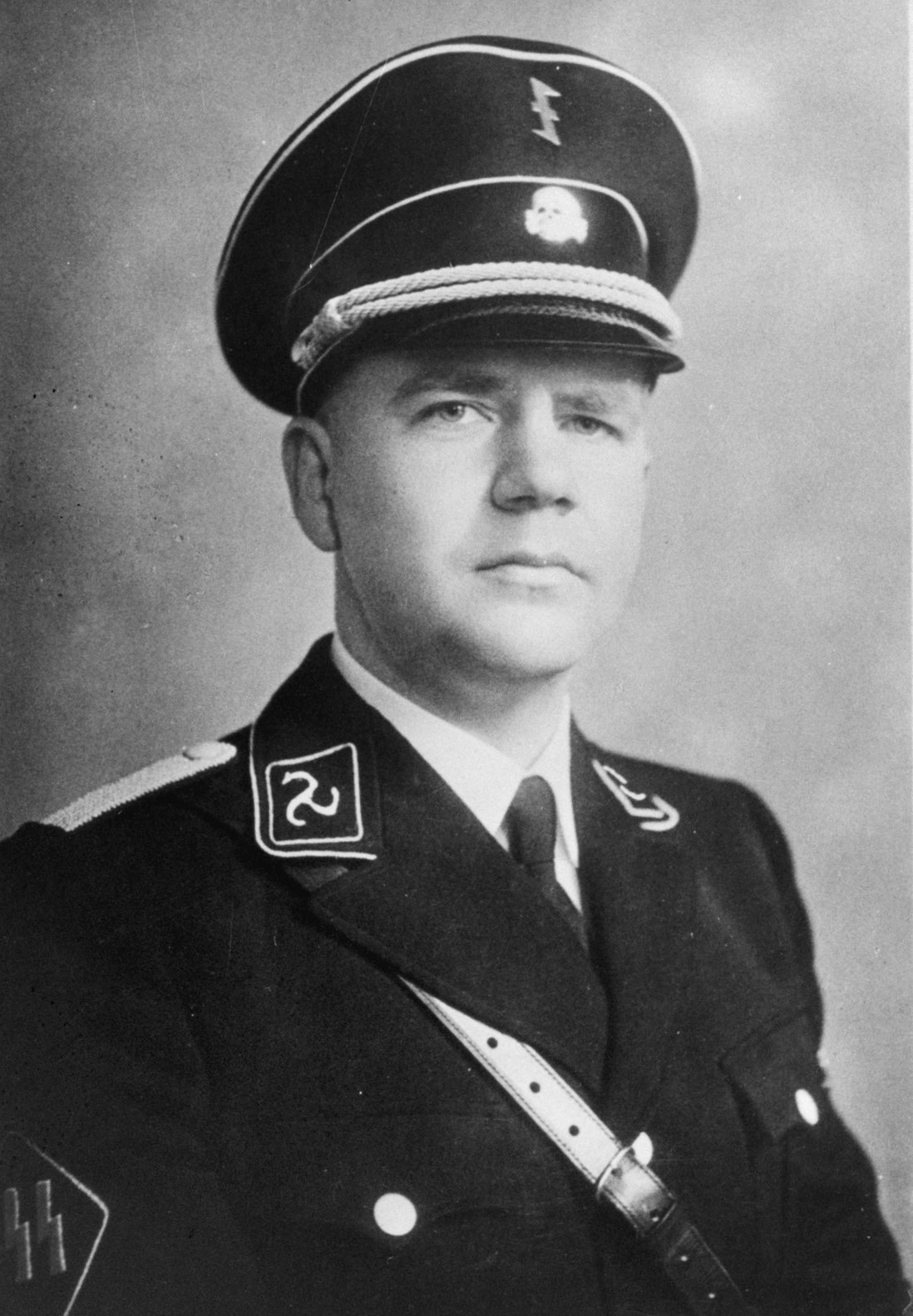
- Feldmeijer in his SS uniform
- Born: Johannes Hendrik Veldmeijer; November 30, 1910; Assen, Netherlands
- Died: February 22, 1945 (aged 34); Raalte, Netherlands
- Military career
- Allegiance: Nazi Germany
- Branch: Nederlandsche SS
- Service years: 1940–1945
- Rank: Hauptsturmführer
- Conflicts: World War II

Johannes Hendrik Feldmeijer (30 November 1910 – 22 February 1945) was a Dutch Nazi politician and a member of the NSB. He was the commander of the SS-Sonderkommando-Feldmeijer death squad during Operation Silbertanne.

== Early years ==
He was born in Assen on 30 November 1910 as Johannes Hendrik Veldmeijer. In 1915, his family's name was changed to Feldmeijer. He used only his middle name, making him Henk Feldmeijer. He graduated from high school in 1928 with top grades in every subject, and started studying mathematics and physics. He interrupted his education to perform national service in 1931. During this period he met a leader of the recently established Stormtroopers of the National Socialist Movement (NSB). He was inspired by the ideas of this movement to become member number 479 in 1932. As one of the first 1,000 members, he had direct access to the movement's leader Anton Mussert. He made many speeches in and around Groningen about the need of a strong leader (Mussert) and against democracy. His speaking talents were quickly recognized, and he got a paid position in the propaganda department. He made many journeys to Nazi Germany, during which he had meetings with SS members; he also visited Scandinavia and Mussolini's Italy. After failing his exams in 1935, he broke off his education and became a full-time employee of the NSB stationed in Utrecht. Because of his membership in the NSB he was fired as a reserve-officer of the army in 1935.

== Ideological development ==
Feldmeijer belonged to the völkisch group in the NSB, just like Meinoud Rost van Tonningen. This group tried to cultivate the Germanic part of Dutch history, and promoted a racist and anti-semitic view. Feldmeijer had many secret contacts in German SS circles, of which his NSB superiors were not aware. The Völkisch group in the NSB caused a radicalisation of the party's viewpoints. They idealised the lives of the Germanic forefathers of the Dutch people, and the proponents of these theories performed much research on these ideas.

In 1937, Feldmeijer became an important member of the organisation Der Vaderen Erfdeel (Heritage of our forefathers), renamed Volksche Werkgemeenschap (Volkisch working community) in 1940; This group performed the research for the völkisch group in the NSB. The Dutch people had to learn to realise that their culture was a Germanic culture; an important step in the direction of the SS way of thinking. Feldmeijer was strongly attracted to the SS ideology, but had to keep his ties with this organisation a secret as the NSB did not fully appreciate this.

In the autumn of 1937, he was forced to leave the headquarters of the NSB in Utrecht because of a conflict with the NSB leader Anton Mussert, and was made the district leader of Salland. In August 1939 Rost van Tonningen appointed him as commander of the Mussert guards. Feldmeijer based the organisation of this paramilitary group of several hundred men on the SS organisation in Germany. In 1939 he made several trips to Berlin to advise the Germans on the Dutch language transmissions of Radio-Bremen. On 3 May 1940 the Dutch government imprisoned him in Fort Ooltgensplaat, where he shared a cell with Rost van Tonningen. He was later transported to France via Belgium, and on 30 May 1940 he was liberated by German troops in Calais. On 2 June 1940 Feldmeijer and Rost van Tonningen arrived back in Den Haag. That same night Rost van Tonningen was invited to a meeting with Heinrich Himmler and Artur Seyss-Inquart to discuss the Nazification of the Netherlands and the establishment of a Dutch SS. A few days later, Rost van Tonningen introduced Feldmeijer to Hanns Albin Rauter, the German head of the Dutch occupied territories police, who was impressed with the vigour and charisma of the young Dutchman.

== Dutch SS ==
Feldmeijer was tasked with establishing and commanding the Nederlandsche SS. Mussert had opposed the creation of the SS in the Netherlands, but German pressure had made him agree to its establishment. De Nederlandsche SS had a maximum membership of 4,000 on 1 November 1942. It always had a double standard, as it was seen as part of the NSB and at the same time part of the German SS. In theory, it was under the leadership of Anton Mussert but in reality Feldmeijer reported to Himmler and his representative in the Netherlands, Hanns Albin Rauter. Feldmeijer stimulated his members to contribute actively to the German war effort: he himself served at the front twice: April–May 1941 as a gunner in the Leibstandarte Adolf Hitler in Yugoslavia and Greece, and June 1942 – March 1943 as Flak commander in SS-Division Wiking at the Eastern Front in Southern Russia. In March 1943 he was promoted to SS-Standartenführer in the Allgemeine SS and in March 1944, after completion of an officer training course, he was promoted to SS-Hauptsturmführer in the Waffen-SS. He was decorated with the Iron Cross 2nd Class, the Sturmabzeichen and the Verwundetenabzeichen in black.

== Conflicts within the NSB ==
Feldmeijer had many conflicts with other members of the NSB because of his strong dedication to the SS. The SS wanted a complete integration of the Netherlands in the Greater German Reich. On the other hand, Mussert wanted a German League of Nations, with Germany as a leading member of the European union of states. The German occupation authorities saw in Feldmeijer a willing tool to keep Mussert's ambitions in check. The conflict between the SS and the NSB came to the boil in May 1943, and while Feldmeijer and Mussert made a public appearance together to show their good relations, in practice all ties between the NSB and the German SS were severed.

== War crimes and death ==
Feldmeijer supported the retaliatory measures taken against the resistance actions against NSB members. He was the commander of the SS-Sonderkommando-Feldmeijer between September 1943 and September 1944, and executed at least 20 people for resistance activities in an operation named Silbertanne Aktion. Other prominent members of the commando were Heinrich Boere, and Klaas Carel Faber and his brother. In February 1945 he was appointed to command a battalion of the Landstorm Nederland.

While driving to his position at the front, his car was strafed by an Allied fighter plane and Feldmeijer was killed. He was buried in Haren several days later. Himmler sent Rauter a telegram after hearing of the death of Feldmeijer:

I am very sad over the death of Feldmeijer. Please convey my condolences to his wife. Feldmeijer was the future of Holland in my eyes. Don't bother to offer my condolences to Mister Mussert, as he never knew what kind of man he had in Feldmeijer.
