= Miroslav Formánek =

Slovak ski jumper (born 1984)

Personal information
- Born: December 25, 1984 (age 41)

Sport
- Sport: Skiing
- Club: LKS Dukla Banská Bystrica

Achievements and titles
- Personal bests: 180.5 m Oberstdorf (2001)

Miroslav Formánek (born 25 December 1984) is a Slovak former ski jumper. He represented Slovakia internationally and won medals at national championships. He competed at the FIS Nordic World Ski Championships 2001 (26th place in the individual normal hill event). He participated twice in the World Junior Championships (2001 and 2002) and also at the European Youth Olympic Festival (2001).

== Career ==
=== Early career ===
In the second half of the 1990s (from 1995 to 2000), Formánek repeatedly took part in international local competitions for children and youth held in the Czech Republic and Slovakia. During this period, he also appeared in national competitions in Poland (including the 1999 Polish Summer Ski Jumping Championships).

=== 2000–01 season ===
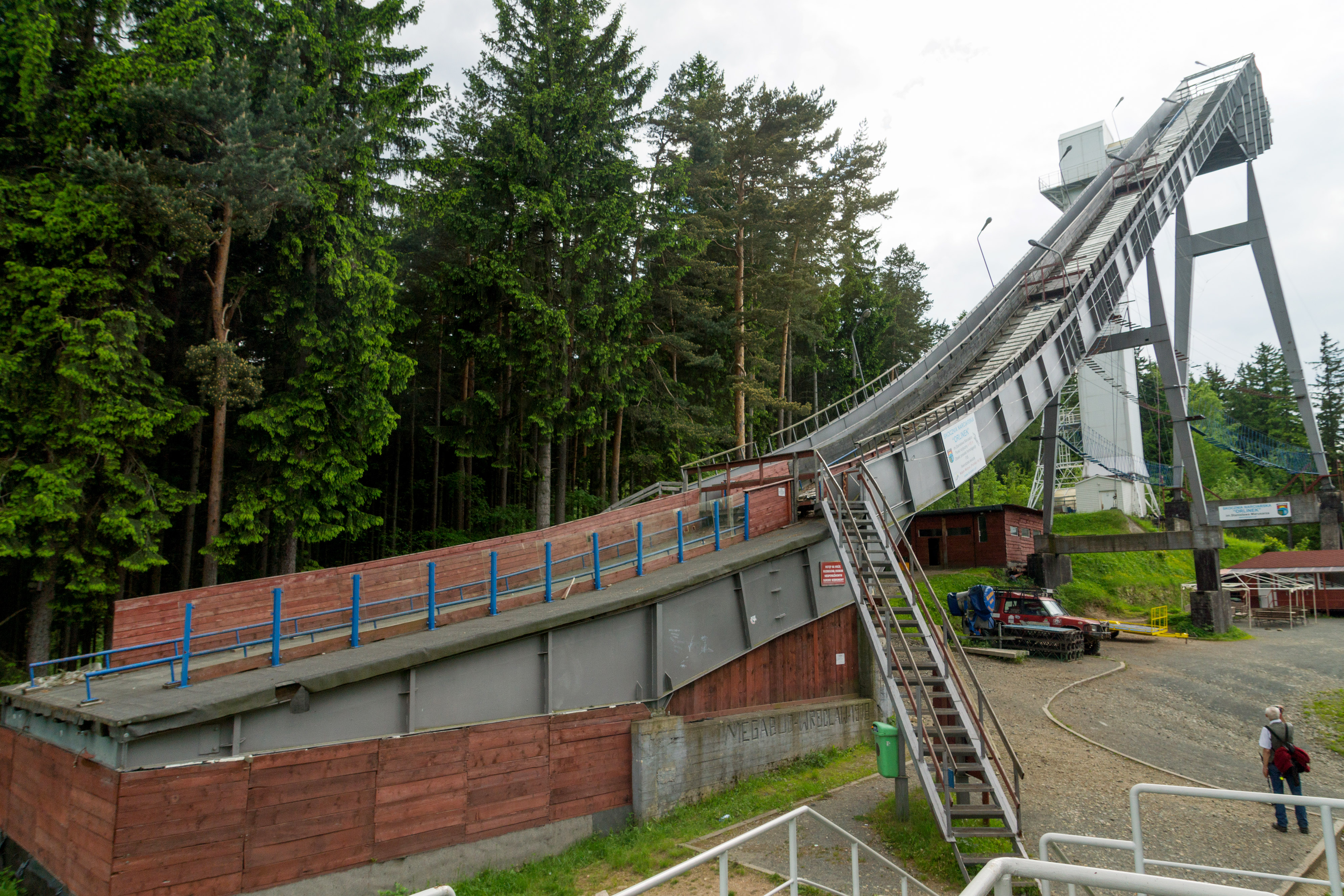
Orlinek (June 2013) in Karpacz – the hill where Formánek made his official international debut

Formánek made his debut in official international ski jumping competitions under the auspices of the International Ski Federation on 1 February 2001 in Karpacz, where he placed 12th with the Slovak team in the team event at the 2001 FIS Junior Nordic World Ski Championships. Individually, he achieved the 4th best result in the competition. Two days later, in the individual event, he finished 6th (ex aequo with Tomasz Pochwała), missing the podium by 12 points. Thanks to this performance, he was selected, along with Matej Uram, for the Slovak team at the FIS Nordic World Ski Championships 2001.

On 6 February 2001 in Štrbské Pleso, during the 2001 Slovak Ski Jumping Championships, he won the silver medal in the individual normal hill event and, with the first team of LKS Dukla Banská Bystrica, the national team title on the same hill.

Before the senior World Championships, he participated in five Continental Cup events between 9 and 18 February 2001, advancing to the second round each time – individually placing 6th (in Schönwald im Schwarzwald), 23rd (in Titisee-Neustadt), and 25th (in Planica), and in team events 8th (Titisee-Neustadt) and 7th (Planica). With 54 points earned individually, he was classified 131st in the overall standings of the 2000–01 Continental Cup season. Thanks to his results in the individual events in Schönwald and Titisee-Neustadt, he also finished 13th in the Schwarzwald Tournament.

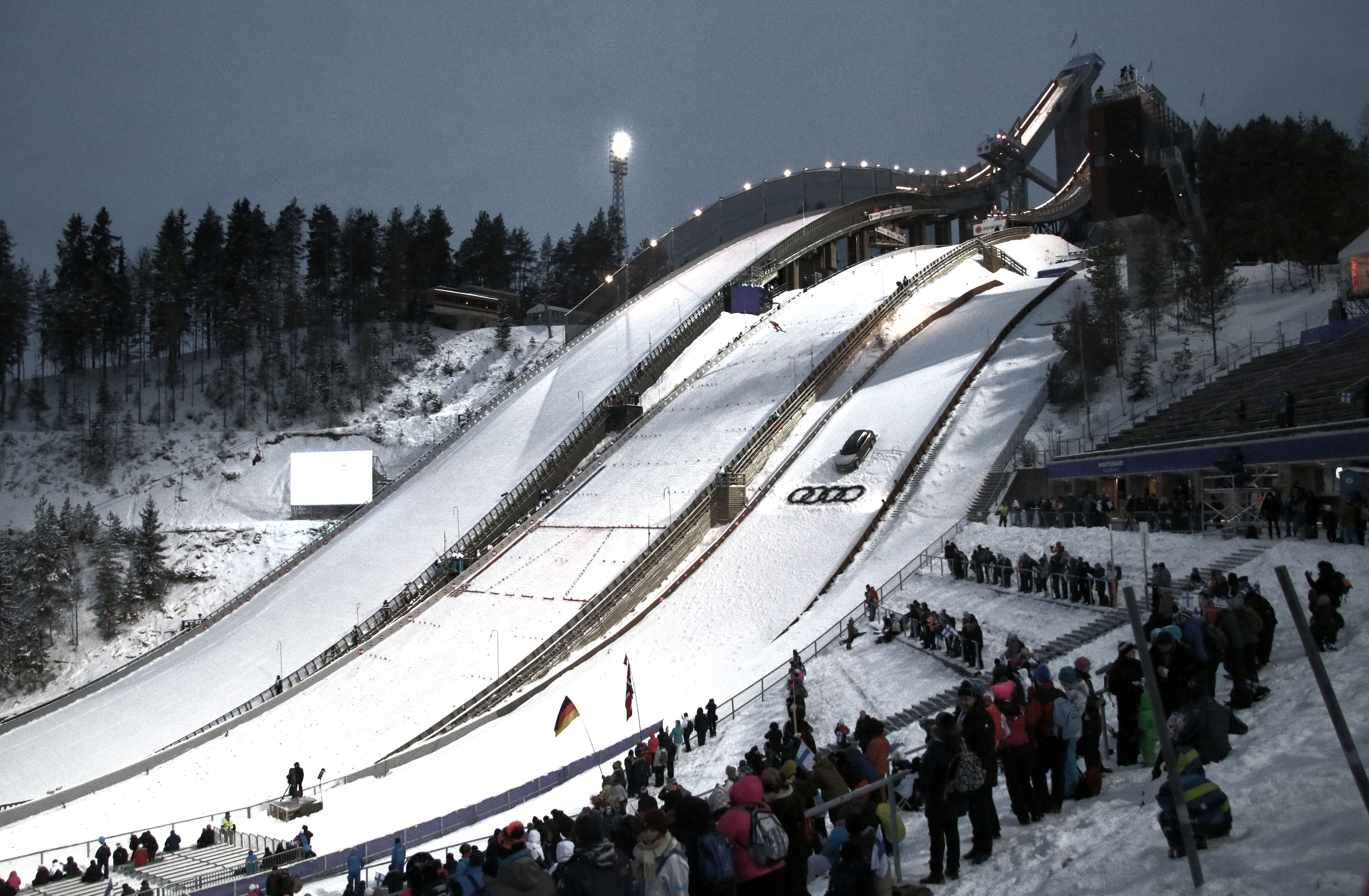
Salpausselkä complex (February 2017) in Lahti – on the normal hill (center in the photo), Formánek placed 26th at the 2001 senior World Championships

On 23 February 2001, at just over 16 years old, he finished 26th in his senior World Championships debut in the individual normal hill event (ex aequo with Marcin Bachleda). He thus became one of three Slovak jumpers (alongside Martin Mesík and Martin Švagerko) to place in the top 30 of an individual World Championships event.

In March 2001, he was entered for World Cup events for the first time but failed to qualify for the ski flying competitions held on 3 and 4 March in Oberstdorf, Germany. He set his personal best of 180.5 metres there.

He ended the 2000–01 season at the 2001 European Youth Olympic Winter Festival in Vuokatti in March 2001, finishing 14th individually and 11th in the team event.

In the Slovak Ski Association's "Skier of the Year 2001" poll, he scored 79 points, placing 4th (behind Ivan Bátory, Veronika Velez-Zuzulová, and Martin Bajčičák).

=== 2001–02 season ===
In summer 2001, he competed in six Continental Cup events – failing to qualify twice in Villach, placing 32nd and 16th in Calgary, and 17th and 21st in Park City, Utah. He was scheduled to compete in Oberhof but was not entered due to illness with the flu. In October 2001 in Banská Bystrica, he won the Slovak junior summer championship on plastic (the event was open; among foreigners, he lost to Pavel Fízek (born 1985) and Jan Mazoch).

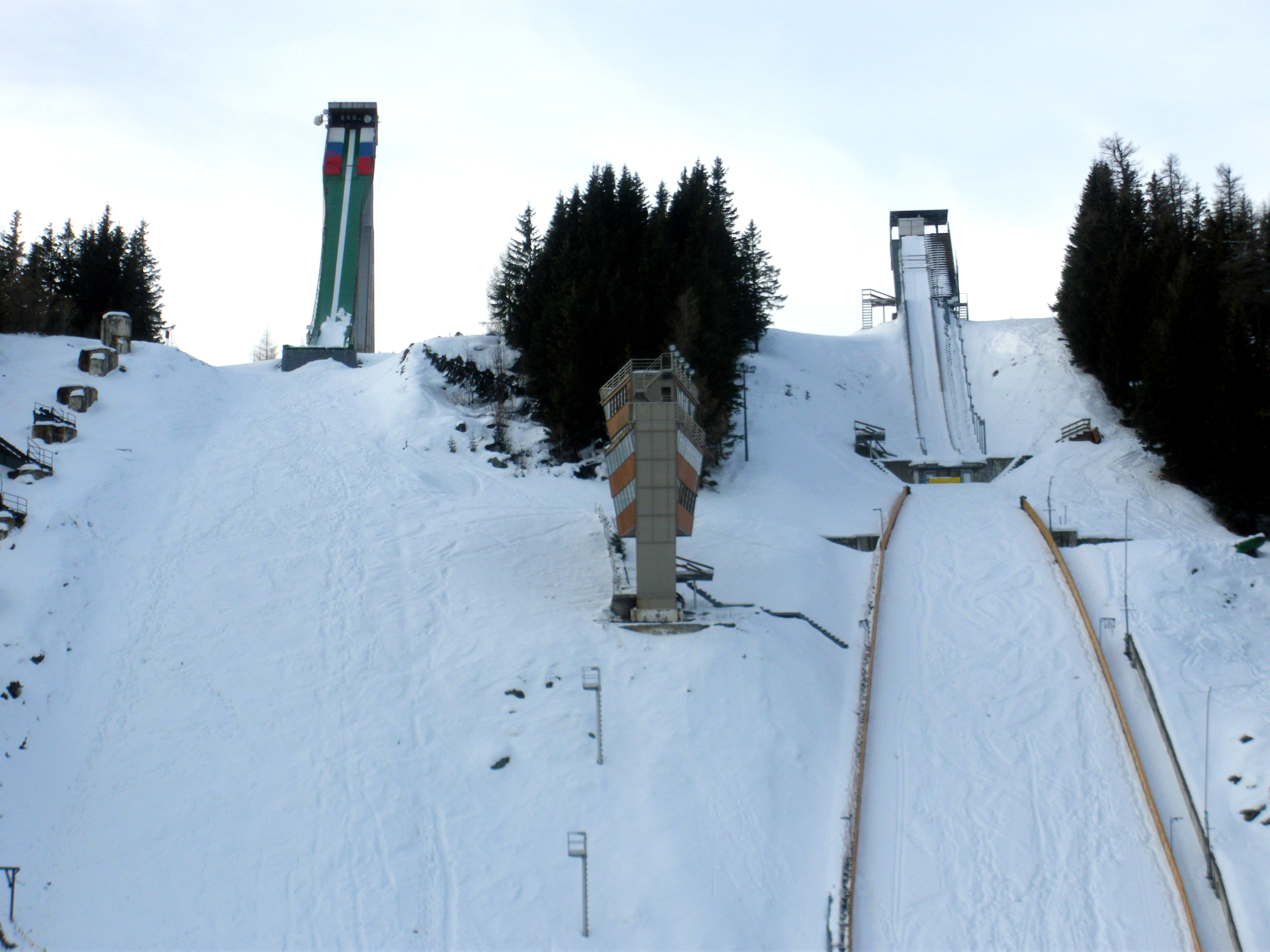
Normal hill MS 1970 B (right in the photo; January 2012) in Štrbské Pleso – where Formánek won national medals in both senior and junior categories

As of late October 2001, Formánek was the only Slovak ski jumper qualified for the 2002 Winter Olympics. In the 2001–02 winter season, after placing 55th and 60th in Continental Cup events in Rukatunturi on 17 and 18 November 2001, he did not compete internationally until mid-January 2002, prompting the Slovak Ski Association to consider replacing him with Martin Mesík for the 2002 Winter Olympics. Ultimately, no Slovak jumper attended the games.

Formánek returned to international competition on 26 January 2002, placing 32nd in the individual event at the Junior World Championships. By the end of the 2001–02 winter season, he competed in three more Continental Cup events, placing 46th and 52nd in Gallio and 68th in Schönwald im Schwarzwald. With 39 points from summer Continental Cup events, he finished 160th in the 2001–02 Continental Cup season. His start in Schönwald placed him 84th in the Schwarzwald Tournament.

In February 2002 in Štrbské Pleso, he won the Slovak junior title in the individual normal hill event. He also won the open junior event, defeating Polish peers.

=== 2002–03 season ===
In October 2002 in Banská Bystrica, he won bronze at the 2002 Slovak Summer Ski Jumping Championships in the individual medium hill event (4th in the open competition, behind Slovaks Rastislav Leško and Vladimír Roško, and Czech Jiří Mazoch). He did not compete in any official FIS summer events in 2002. He returned internationally in the 2002–03 winter season, placing 85th and 84th in Continental Cup events in Titisee-Neustadt on 25 and 26 January 2003.

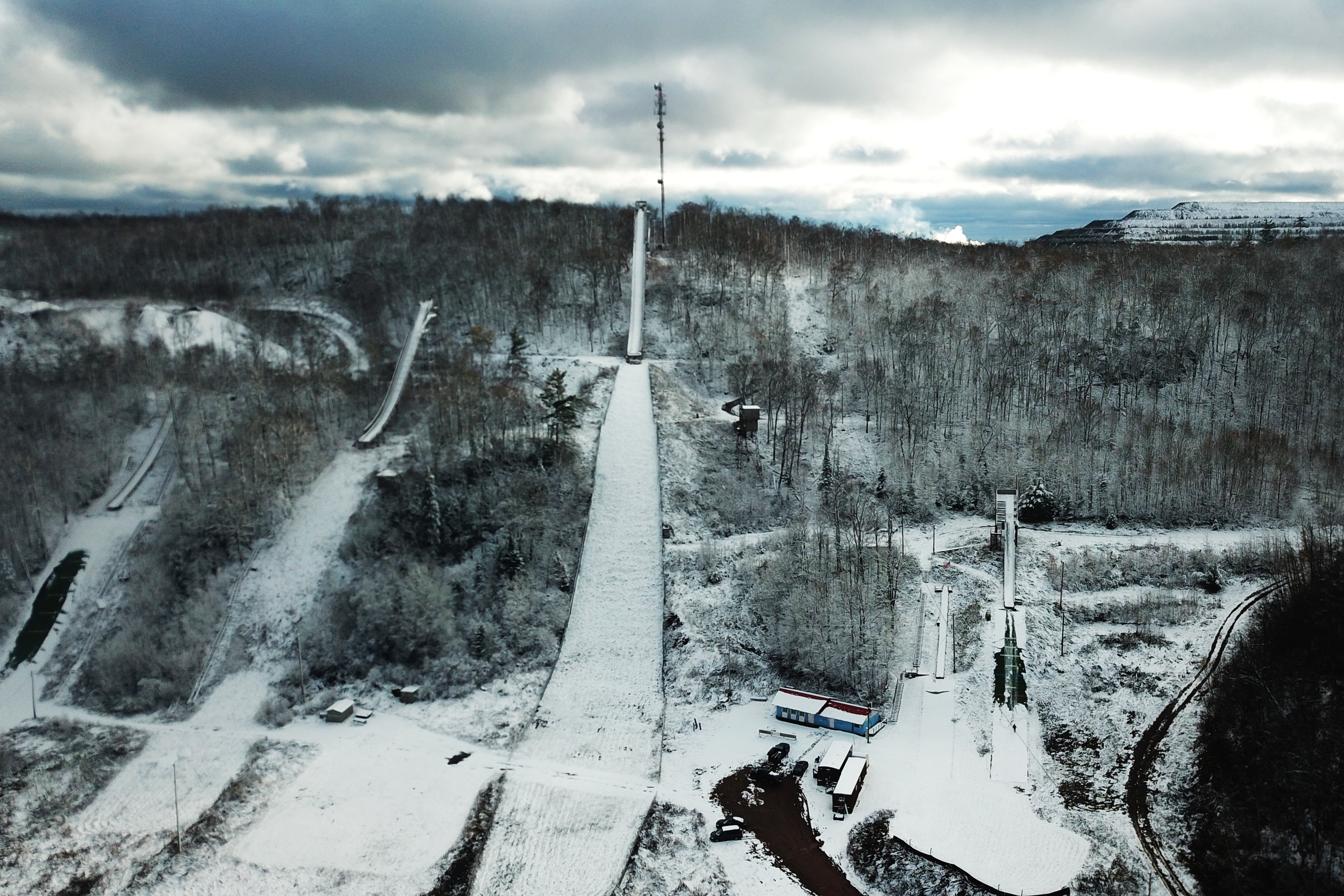
Suicide Hill Ski Jump (center; October 2017) in Ishpeming, Michigan – the hill where Formánek last competed internationally

At the turn of February and March 2003, he competed in Continental Cup events in the United States. After 51st in Westby, Wisconsin, he placed in the top 30 in the three events in Ishpeming, Michigan, finishing 24th twice and 19th once. This last start on 2 March 2003, at age 19 years and 2 months, was his final official international competition. Thus, 2 years and 1 month passed between his first (1 February 2001) and last (2 March 2003) international start.

With 26 points from the American events, he finished 135th in the 2002–03 Continental Cup season.

He ended his competitive career before November 2003.
