= Irmgard Furchner =

Stutthof concentration camp personnel (1925–2025)

- Born: Irmgard Magdalene Dirksen; 29 May 1925; Kalthof, Free City of Danzig
- Died: 14 January 2025 (aged 99); Quickborn, Schleswig-Holstein, Germany
- Occupations: Secretary; stenographer
- Known for: Working at the Stutthof concentration camp
- Spouse: Heinz Gerhard Furchner (died 1972)
- Convictions: Accessory to murder (11,412 counts); Accessory to attempted murder (18 counts)
- Penalty: Two-year suspended jail term

Irmgard Magdalene Furchner (née Dirksen; 29 May 1925 – 14 January 2025) was a German concentration camp secretary and stenographer at the Stutthof concentration camp, where she worked for camp commandant Paul-Werner Hoppe. In 2021, at the age of 96, she was charged with 11,412 counts of accessory to murder and 18 additional counts of accessory to attempted murder, and in December 2022, she was found guilty and sentenced to a suspended jail term of two years. Her conviction was upheld by the German Federal Court of Justice in August 2024. She is likely to be the last person ever to be tried for Holocaust-related crimes.

== Trial ==
Furchner's trial was held in a juvenile court in Itzehoe, as Furchner was only 18 years old at the time of the alleged offenses. She had worked at the camp between June 1943 and April 1945. She had announced in advance that she did not wish to appear in court and asked the judge not to expect her to do so; indicating in a letter that she would boycott her trial as "degrading". In a criminal trial, however, the presence of the accused is essential.

In February 2021, German prosecutors charged Furchner with at least 10,000 counts of accessory to murder. Upon being charged, Furchner acknowledged that she had worked as the secretary to SS officer Paul Werner Hoppe in Stutthof, though she still denied ever setting foot in the camp or knowing of the murders which took place there. At the end of September 2021, a few hours before the start of her trial, she left the Quickborn retirement home where she resided and took a cab to the Norderstedt Mitte subway station. The president of the criminal chamber subsequently issued a warrant for her arrest; Furchner was quickly captured and arrested. Five days later, she was released from pretrial detention under conditions, including the wearing of an ankle monitor. The trial was postponed until 19 October 2021. Towards the end of the trial, Furchner stated "I'm sorry for everything that happened. I regret that I was in Stutthof at the time. I can't say anything else."

On 20 December 2022, Furchner was found guilty of complicity in the murders of more than 10,500 people and sentenced to a two-year suspended jail term. On 20 August 2024, the German Federal Court of Justice upheld Furchner's conviction.

When news of Furchner's death was made public in April 2025, The Times of Israel reported that she would likely be the last person to be convicted for a Holocaust crime. The Washington Post further noted that her trial was "one of the final efforts to bring legal justice to victims of the Holocaust." However, a Frankfurt based court had ruled in December 2024 that a former guard at Sachsenhausen could also face trial. This former Sachsenhausen guard, identified as Gregor Formanek, later died in April 2025.

== Personal life and death ==
Following the end of World War II, Furchner married Heinz Gerhard Furchner (a former SS squad leader who died in 1972). She was later employed as an administrative worker in northern Germany.

Furchner died in Quickborn on 14 January 2025, at the age of 99. Her death was not made public until April 2025.
