= Peter Egner =

Yugoslav-born naturalized American citizen & former Nazi SS & SD member (1922-2011)

Peter Egner (1 February 1922 in Yugoslavia – 26 January 2011 in Bellevue, Washington, United States) was born in Yugoslavia, a Volksdeutscher who had acquired American citizenship in 1965. He was involved as a member of the Sicherheitsdienst (SD) in the guarding of prisoners at Auschwitz concentration camp and the Holocaust in Yugoslavia. Egner was on the List of Most Wanted Nazi War Criminals of the Simon Wiesenthal Center.

== Life ==
Egner was a member of the intelligence service of the Nazi Party, the SD. After the war, Egner emigrated to the United States. In 1965, he applied for U.S. citizenship, which he acquired the following year. He worked as a food and beverage manager before retiring in 1980. He lived quietly with his wife in Portland, Oregon. During his naturalization, Egner stated that he had been a Wehrmacht soldier, but concealed his involvement in the SD.

== Role as a Wachmann in Yugoslavia ==
Egner served in an Einsatzgruppe, a majority of whose members were Volksdeutsche, during the Nazi occupation of Yugoslavia. The unit murdered an estimated 17,444 Jews and Serbs from the beginning of 1942. They used specially adapted gas vans, closed vans that were fed the exhaust from the engine; the victims, locked in the back of the van, died from the carbon monoxide poisoning. The SD played a crucial role in the extermination of Jews, Romani people, Communists, homosexuals, people with disabilities and other minorities during the Third Reich. Documents show that Egner, as a Wachmann (guard), escorted a train of Sinti and Roma men, women and children to Auschwitz.

For a long time, Egner insisted that he was merely a Wehrmacht soldier who was shot and wounded in 1943. Judicial documents from 2010 show that he rose to be a sergeant in the Einsatzgruppen. Egner said that he lied at the time of his initial statements because he was "embarrassed" by his involvement in the SD. He swore that he escorted two other trains to Judenlager Semlin, where Jewish and Gypsy women and children were killed, many in gas vans, and a fourth train to Avala, where prisoners were shot and buried. Many of the Avala victims were killed in reprisal for partisan attacks on German and SS units. They had been interrogated at the security police headquarters.

Egner was shot and wounded in 1943, though it was during a partisan attack. He insisted that he was merely a guard who neither saw nor perpetrated any crimes and knew nothing of the function of the camps.

Serbia checked Egner's role in executions at Avala and Judenlager Semlin and issued an international arrest warrant. On 26 January 2011, Egner died of natural causes in a retirement home in Bellevue, Washington, near Seattle.
