= Operation Last Chance =

Mission of the Simon Wiesenthal Center

- Date: July 2002 – present
- Location: Worldwide
- Type: Nazi hunting; Criminal investigation
- Organised by: Simon Wiesenthal Center
- Participants: Efraim Zuroff, U.S. Justice Department's Nazi War Crimes Unit
- Outcome: Denaturalization and prosecution of several alleged Nazi war criminals; reward for information increased to $25,000
- Charges: War crimes, crimes against humanity, accessory to murder, falsifying immigration documents

Operation Last Chance was launched July 2002 by the Simon Wiesenthal Center with its mission statement being to track down ex-Nazis still in hiding. Most of them were nearing the end of their lifetimes, hence the operation's name. Efraim Zuroff is director of the Wiesenthal Center in Jerusalem who serves as the Israeli liaison as well as overseer of this project, the focus of which is an investigation, prosecution, and conviction of the last remaining Nazi war criminals and collaborators. Many have obtained citizenship in Canada and the United States under false pretenses; usually by misrepresentation, omission, or falsification of their criminal past, specifically, war crimes which rose to the level of crimes against humanity.

== Prosecutions and convictions ==
Operation Last Chance assisted in the prosecution and interim conviction of John Demjanjuk for his alleged role in the torture and murder of Jews in various concentration camps, among other atrocities. Demjanjuk became an American citizen in the 1950s. Demjanjuk had previously been exonerated of genocide and crimes against humanity by Israel's Supreme Court. Demjanjuk was later accused by Germany of being a Ukrainian collaborator (sometimes referred to by camp inmates as Askaris) and camp guard at Sobibor. In May 2011, a Munich lower criminal court found Demjanjuk guilty of being an accessory to murder at Sobibór extermination camp, where about 250,000 Jews were murdered. Demjanjuk denied all accusations and appealed the verdict. Shortly after Demjanjuk's death in 2012, the German Appellate Court announced that, because Demjanjuk died before his appeal could be heard, Demjanjuk had no criminal record, that his previous interim conviction by a lower court was annulled, and that Demjanjuk was innocent.

Following the Demjanjuk case, the Operation Last Chance team of investigators, attorneys, and German prosecutors began to focus on another Ukrainian national, a Nazi collaborator who had illegally sought and obtained refuge in the United States, John Kalymon. In 2007, as a result of prosecution by the Office of Special Investigations, U.S. Department of Justice, a Federal District Court stripped John Kalymon of his United States citizenship for falsifying his background on his immigration documents and naturalization papers. The District Court judge found that Kalymon had been a member of the Ukrainian auxiliary police and assisted the Nazis in the persecution of the Jewish population confined in the Lemberg ghetto until its liquidation in 1943. The Jewish population of Lemberg (Lwów, today Lviv, Ukraine) was the third largest Jewish community in Poland.

In 2011, an immigration judge in Detroit found Kalymon removable for his misrepresentations, a finding affirmed on appeal. These courts affirmed the lower court's finding of fact, that during the course of his collaboration with the Germans, Kalymon had murdered at least one Jew and wounded at least one other while serving as a Ukrainian Policeman in the city. It was on this basis that his deportation was ordered.

Like Demjanjuk, if the appellate process had been exhausted, Kalymon "may be deported to Germany, Ukraine, Poland or any other country that will accept him..." based on the ruling of U.S. Immigration Court Judge Elizabeth Hacker.

In 2014, prosecutors in Munich, Germany filed an arrest warrant for Kalymon for being an accessory to war crimes. Legal complications prevented any interviews or an extradition. Kalymon died later that year in June, before he could ever be tried for the crimes.

== "Operation Last Chance 2" ==
Formally Launched December, 2011 by Efraim Zuroff, director of the Wiesenthal Centre in Israel, the project will be offering rewards. On January 15, 2008, the reward offered by the Wiesenthal Center for information leading to the arrest and conviction of former Nazis and Nazi collaborators was increased from $10,000 to $25,000. for clues to persons who worked in either the extermination camps or in the so-called "Aktion Squads." The Aktion Squads, or Einsatzgruppen, were responsible for the murder of some 1.5 million Polish, Russian, and Baltic (Lithuania, Latvia, Estonia) Jews as concentration camps like Treblinka, Auschwitz and the Operation Reinhardt Camps were being built and even at the same time they were utilized in the western areas of Nazi-occupied Poland and eastern General Government (GG) Galicia regions, respectively.

== Ongoing investigations and prosecutions/Other Last Chance case files ==
Kalymon's deportation order came only days after another accused Nazi war criminal, Serbian Volksdeutsche collaborator Peter Egner, had died in Washington state before he could face a February 22 trial aimed at stripping him of his U.S. citizenship. He was accused by U.S. prosecutors of helping commit genocide by serving as a transport guard for mobile gas chambers and trains bound for the Auschwitz death camp. Previously Egner had admitted he belonged to a Nazi-run security unit but denied participation in war crimes.

Since its inception, the U.S. Justice Department's Nazi War Crimes Unit (Office of Special Investigations) has won cases against 107 people in the United States who were identified as participating in Nazi persecutions during World War II. Excluding Kalymon, there are eight similar cases still pending all of which are within the purview, scope and mission of Operation Last Chance.
