= Mány =

Mány Maan
- Flag Coat of arms

- Location of Fejér county in Hungary

- Location of Mány
- Coordinates: 47.5328°N 18.65455°E
- Country: Hungary
- County: Fejér

Area
  - Total: 44.72 km^{2} (17.27 sq mi)

Population (2004)
  - Total: 2,374
  - Density: 53.08/km^{2} (137.5/sq mi)
- Time zone: UTC+1 (CET)
  - Summer (DST): UTC+2 (CEST)
- Postal code: 2065
- Area code: 22
- Motorways: M1
- Distance from Budapest: 34.8 km (21.6 mi) East
- Website: www.many.hu

Mány (German: Maan) is a town in Hungary, located in the north-east of Fejér County in the Zsámbéki Basin.

== History ==
In the Middle Ages Mány was in Esztergom county. Mány and Örs were completely destroyed in the first decades of the Turkish occupation. From 1611 there was a Batthyány estate, but in 1680 Batthyány family pledged their estates in Mány and Bicske. In 1703 Mány was moved to Fejér County.

== Archaeology ==
In August 2022, archaeologists from the Szent István Király Múzeum announced the discovery of a Bronze Age cemetery with 8 burials. One of the burials contained the remains of an outstanding young woman buried with small ceramic pots and 38 adorned gold and bronze decorative jewelry, such as gold rings, torcs, spiral shaped armlets, a gold hair ring.

== Relations ==
Mány's German sister city is Leimen.
