= Efraim Zuroff =

American-born Israeli historian and Nazi hunter (born 1948)

- אפרים זורוף
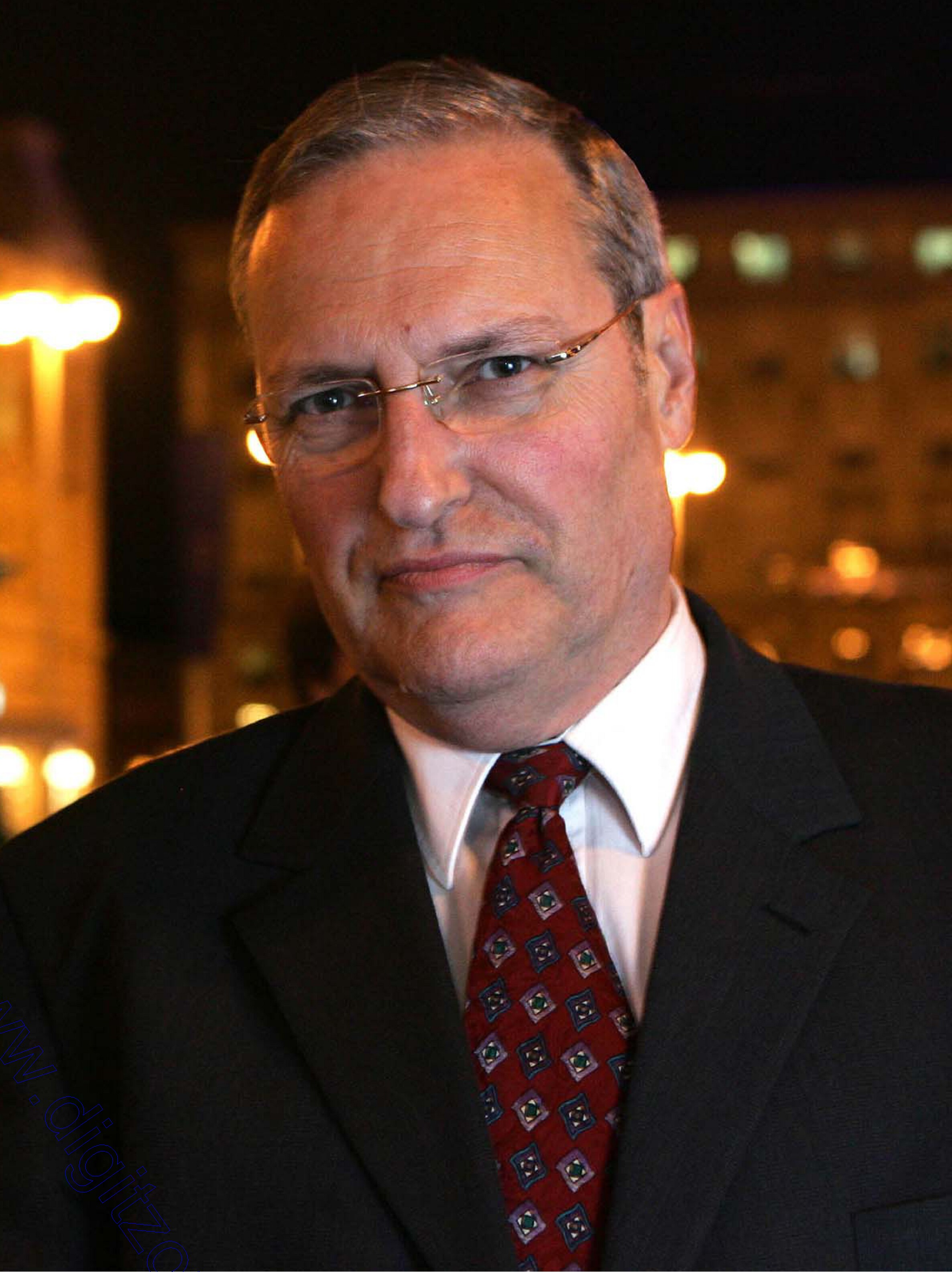
- Zuroff in 2007
- Born: 5 August 1948 (age 78); New York City, U.S.
- Citizenship: American, Israeli
- Education: Yeshiva University; Hebrew University of Jerusalem (PhD)
- Occupation: Nazi hunter
- Children: 4

Efraim Zuroff (Hebrew: אפרים זורוף; born August 5, 1948) is an American-born Israeli historian and Nazi hunter who has played a key role in bringing Nazi and fascist war criminals to trial. Zuroff, director of the Simon Wiesenthal Center office in Jerusalem, is the coordinator of Nazi war crimes research worldwide for the Wiesenthal Center and the author of its annual "Status Report" on the worldwide investigation and prosecution of Nazi war criminals which includes a list of most-wanted Nazi war criminals.

== Early life ==
Born in New York City, Zuroff moved to Israel in 1970 after completing his undergraduate degree in history (with honors) at Yeshiva University and high school studies at Yeshiva University High School for Boys. He obtained an M.A. degree in Holocaust studies at the Institute of Contemporary Jewry of the Hebrew University, where he also completed his Ph.D., which chronicles the response of Orthodox Jewry in the United States to the Holocaust and focuses on the rescue attempts launched by the Vaad ha-Hatzala rescue committee established by American Orthodox rabbis in 1939.

In 2000, Yeshiva University Press and KTAV Publishing House published his study of the history of the Vaad ha-Hatzala, which was awarded an Egit Grant for Holocaust and Jewish Resistance Literature by the Israeli General Federation of Labor (Histadrut) and also received the 1999-2000 Samuel Belkin Literary Award for the best book published by a Yeshiva University alumnus in the field of Jewish studies.

== Career ==
=== Simon Wiesenthal Center ===
In 1978, he was invited to be the first director of the Simon Wiesenthal Center in Los Angeles, where he played a leading role in establishing the center's library and archives and was historical advisor for the center's Academy award-winning documentary Genocide. He returned to Israel in 1980, where he served as a researcher for the U.S. Justice Department's Office of Special Investigations. His efforts assisted in the preparation of cases against numerous Nazi war criminals living in the United States.

He rejoined the Wiesenthal Center in 1986 and uncovered the postwar escape of hundreds of Nazi war criminals to Australia, Canada, Great Britain and other countries. He continued to coordinate the center's international efforts to bring perpetrators of the Holocaust to justice. These efforts have influenced the passage of special laws in Canada (1987), Australia (1989) and Great Britain (1991) which enable the prosecution in those countries of Nazi war criminals.

Since the Fall of Communism and the dissolution of the Soviet Union, Zuroff has played a major role in the efforts to convince Lithuania, Latvia, and Estonia and other post-Communist societies to confront the widespread complicity of their nationals in the crimes of the Holocaust and to prosecute local Nazi collaborators. His public advocacy on these issues was instrumental in the submission by Lithuania and Latvia of indictments (Aleksandras Lileikis, Kazys Gimžauskas, and Algimantas Dailidė) and/or extradition requests (Konrāds Kalējs and Antanas Gecevičius) against local Holocaust perpetrators.

Zuroff's activities in Romania were met with failure, however. The country did not prosecute anyone as part of Simon Wiesenthal Center's Operation Last Chance and it also proved to be "technically impossible" to reverse the rehabilitations of Romanian war criminals.

In 1993, Zuroff was appointed by Foreign Minister Shimon Peres to serve on the joint Israeli-Lithuanian commission of inquiry established to deal with pardons issued by the authorities of Lithuania, which had recently regained independence, to people suspected of Nazi war crimes, which has succeeded to date in achieving the cancellation by the Lithuanian authorities of approximately 200 rehabilitations granted to individuals who had participated in the murder of Jews during the Holocaust. In 2000, he claimed to have exposed the rehabilitations granted by the government of Latvia to alleged Nazi war criminals and has led the efforts to cancel these pardons.

Zuroff played an important role in the exposure, arrest, extradition and prosecution of Dinko Šakić, the former commandant of the Ustasha concentration camp Jasenovac. In early October 1999, Šakić, who lived for more than 50 years in Argentina, was sentenced in Zagreb to 20 years' imprisonment (which was the maximum penalty under Croatian law at the time) for his crimes in the first-ever trial of a Nazi war criminal in a post-Communist country.

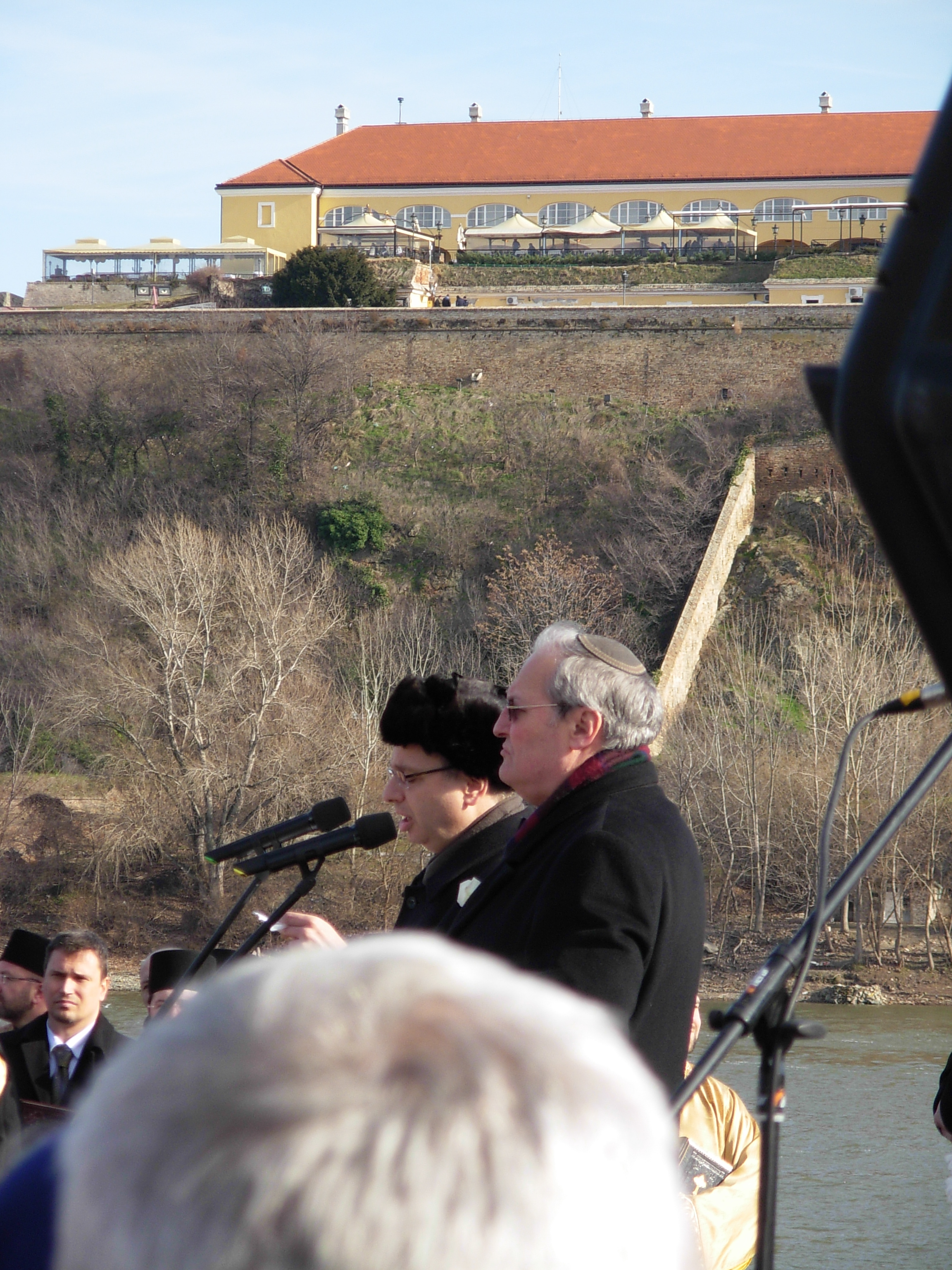
Zuroff in Novi Sad on the 70th anniversary of the Novi Sad Raid.

In his book Occupation: Nazi-Hunter; The Continuing Search for the Perpetrators of the Holocaust (KTAV; Hoboken, 1994), Zuroff chronicles the belated efforts to prosecute Nazi war criminals in western democracies and explains the rationale for such efforts several decades after the crimes. The book was published in German by Ahriman Verlag. Starting in June 1999, Zuroff's activities as a Nazi-hunter were the subject of five television documentaries. The first, entitled The Nazi-Hunter, was produced by ZDF (German Channel 2) in 1999; the second, entitled The Last Nazi-Hunter, was produced by SWR (German Channel 1-regional station) in 2004 and the third, The Final Hunt for the Nazis, by France 3 (Channel 3), was broadcast in December 2005. In 2009, the BBC produced "The Search for Dr. Death which followed Zuroff to South America in search of Dr. Aribert Heim, who committed horrendous crimes as a doctor at Mauthausen. In 2012, Israeli Channel 10 broadcast the documentary film, "Tzayad ha-Natzim ha-Acharon (The Last Nazi-Hunter).

In 2009, Zuroff criticized the Prague Declaration. According to Zuroff, the Holocaust should not be equated with other tragedies, describing the declaration as "the main manifesto of the false equivalency movement" and stating it is supported by right-wing in Eastern Europe.

In September 2024, Zuroff announced that at the end of the month he would be stepping down from the Simon Wiesenthal Center after 38 years.

=== Operation Last Chance ===
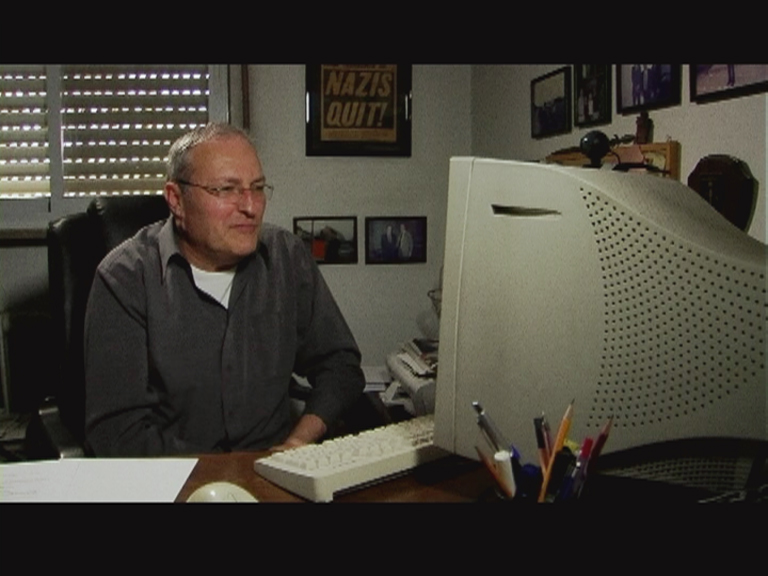
Zuroff in front of the computer

In 2002, together with Aryeh Rubin, the founder of the Targum Shlishi Foundation of Miami, Florida, Zuroff launched Operation Last Chance, which offers financial rewards for information which will facilitate the prosecution and punishment of Nazi war criminals. To date, the project has been initiated in Lithuania, Latvia, Estonia (all in 2002); Poland, Romania, Austria (2003); Croatia, Hungary (2004) and Germany (2005). On January 15, 2008, the prize was increased from $10,000 to $25,000.

His second book on the hunt for Nazi war criminals, Chasseur de nazis (Paris: Michel-Lafon, 2008), written together with French journalist Alexandre Duyck, continues with the story of the renewed efforts spearheaded by Zuroff to hold Holocaust perpetrators accountable, especially in the wake of the breakup of the Soviet Union and the fall of Communism in Eastern Europe, and focuses on the results achieved by "Operation: Last Chance". That book was published in Serbian by the Zavod za udzbenike publishing company under the title Lovac na naciste in 2009 and in Polish by Wydawnictwo Dolnośląskie under the title Łowca Nazistów in 2010.

Zuroff almost completely rewrote the French book about Operation Last Chance in a volume published in English in 2009 by Palgrave Macmillan: Operation Last Chance: One Man's Quest to Bring Nazi Criminals to Justice. That book was published in German by Prospero Verlag in late 2011 under the title Operation Last Chance; Im Fadenkreuz des "Nazi Jaegers" and updated versions were published in 2012 in Serbian, Hungarian and Finnish. In 2013, Propero Verlag published an updated German version. More recently, Romanian and Croatian versions of the book were published.

In 2006, his exposure in Budapest of convicted but unpunished Hungarian gendarme war criminal Sándor Képíró, who was said to be among the officers responsible for the mass murder of approximately 2,000 civilians in the city of Novi Sad, led to a criminal investigation against him, with his trial opening on May 5, 2011. A lawsuit by Képíró against Zuroff for libel was denied. On July 18, 2011, the first-degree judgment declared Sándor Képíró's innocence, but the prosecution appealed against the sentence. Kepiro died in early September 2011, before the appeal was heard. Charles Zentai, who is accused of murdering an 18-year-old Jew, was located by Zuroff and the Hungarian government asked for his extradition from Australia to stand trial in Budapest.

==== Aribert Heim ====
Zuroff continued the hunt for the Nazi war criminal Aribert Heim after Simon Wiesenthal died in 2005. On July 6, 2008, Zuroff headed to South America as part of a public campaign to capture Heim. He elaborated on July 15, 2008 that he was sure Heim was alive and the groundwork had been laid to capture him within weeks. In autumn 2009, his hunt for Aribert Heim, who committed war crimes in the Mauthausen concentration camp, was the subject of a BBC documentary entitled The Search for Dr Death, and a fifth documentary Tzayad ha-Natzim ha-Acharon (The Last Nazi-Hunter), was broadcast on Israeli Channel 10 on Holocaust Memorial Day in 2012.

Zuroff was lukewarm in his reaction to the reported death of Heim in Cairo in 1992. He observed in February 2009 that:

There's no body, no corpse, no DNA, no grave.... Keep in mind these people [Heim's children] have a vested interest in being declared dead - it's a perfectly crafted story; that's the problem, it's too perfect.

Zuroff concedes, however, that Heim had undoubtedly lived in hiding in Egypt. Aribert Heim had reportedly killed "hundreds of inmates at the Mauthausen concentration camp in Austria by injecting gasoline into their hearts and performing surgery and severing organs without anaesthesia" notes Zuroff. In a 2011 interview he called Heim, "his biggest failure." In the light of fresh revelations about the extent to which the CIA and West German intelligence co-operated with Nazi criminals after the war, Zuroff said he thought it quite possible that Heim worked for West German intelligence and that this may have been the reason that he was never prosecuted.

=== Publications and other activities ===
Over the years Zuroff has published more than 450 articles on various topics relating to the Holocaust, as well as other issues of concern in the Jewish world. His publications have appeared in scholarly journals such as Yad Vashem Studies, Simon Wiesenthal Center Annual, Jewish Political Studies Review, and American Jewish History, as well as in the Los Angeles Times, Sueddeutsche Zeitung, die Tageszeitung, Profil, The Boston Globe, The Jerusalem Post, Tikkun, Jerusalem Report, Maariv, Haaretz, Yediot Achronot, The Jewish Chronicle, Eretz Acheret, and other publications.

Zuroff has lectured extensively to audiences all over the world regarding the efforts to bring Nazi war criminals to justice. During the years 1992-1999, he served in the Education Corps of the Israeli Defense Forces (reserves) and lectured to thousands of soldiers about his work.

In 1995 and 1996, Zuroff was invited to Rwanda to assist the local authorities in their efforts to bring to justice the perpetrators of the genocide which took place in that country in spring 1994, and he has served as an official advisor to the Rwandan government.

On March 4, 2020, Zuroff was invited to the Tennessee Holocaust Conference at The First Baptist Church in Greeneville, Tennessee, giving a lecture to approximately one-thousand children, educating them about the horrors of the Holocaust and how he helped arrest Nazis that fled from their punishment after the war.

== Honors ==
In recognition of his efforts as a Nazi-hunter and Holocaust scholar, Zuroff was nominated by Serbian President Boris Tadić and the members of parliament of the Democratic Party of Serbia as a candidate for the 2008 Nobel Peace Prize.

On January 22, 2009, he was granted the honorary citizenship of the Serbian city of Novi Sad, in appreciation for the exposure of Sándor Képíró, who allegedly helped organize the murder of the city's Jews.

On January 15, 2010, Zuroff was decorated with the Order of Duke Trpimir by Croatian President Stjepan Mesić for special contributions against historical revisionism and for the reaffirming of antifascist foundations of the modern Republic of Croatia.

On February 16, 2017, the President of Serbia Tomislav Nikolić awarded the gold medal for Merit to Zuroff for "exceptional achievements" and his "selfless dedication to defending the truth about the suffering of Jews, and also Serbs, Roma and other nations during World War II".

In 2018 he was awarded the Fiddler on the Roof Award in the Social Activism category.

== Views ==
Zuroff has repeatedly refused to characterize the Srebrenica massacre as genocide, although those mass killings were ruled as a genocide by the International Court of Justice as well as by the International Criminal Tribunal for the former Yugoslavia, but denies it was a genocide since women and young children were spared.

Zuroff stated that the Holodomor of 1932–1933 in Ukraine "is definitely not a genocide" and criticized a Ukrainian law which criminalizes Holocaust and Holodomor denial, calling it "a gross distortion of the history of the Holocaust typical of the efforts to equate other tragedies which are not the same as the Holocaust with the crimes of the Nazis".

In a 2010 interview with the controversial right-wing Polish journalist Piotr Zychowicz, Zuroff expressed his support and encouragement for the initiative to prosecute Communist crimes as defined by Polish law "by all available means" and suggested that Communism was a "criminal ideology" comparable to Nazism.

His long-time partner was Rūta Vanaigaitė, a controversial figure in Lithuania for her blasphemy and factual misinterpretation of the Lithuanian partisans.

Zuroff regularly meets with pro-Putin supporters.

== Personal life ==
Zuroff is married and has four children.

== See also ==
- Year 2013 reactions to the 1942 Beisfjord Massacre

== Publications ==
- Ruta Vanagaite, Efraim Zuroff. Our People: Discovering Lithuania's Hidden Holocaust. Rowman & Littlefield Publishers, Incorporated, 2020. - 240 p.
