= Heinrich Boere =

German-Dutch SS Nazi

- Boere in 2010
- Born: 27 September 1921; Eschweiler, Prussia, Germany
- Died: 1 December 2013 (aged 92); Fröndenberg, North Rhine-Westphalia, Germany
- Status: Deceased
- Convictions: Netherlands; War crimes Germany; Murder (3 counts)
- Penalty: Netherlands; Death; Germany; Life imprisonment

Heinrich Boere (27 September 1921 – 1 December 2013) was a convicted German-Dutch war criminal and former member of the Waffen-SS. He was on the Simon Wiesenthal Center's list of most wanted Nazi war criminals.

== Early life ==
Heinrich Boere was born in Eschweiler, Prussia, Germany, to a Dutch father and a German mother, but his parents moved to Maastricht in the Netherlands when he was two years old. He volunteered for the Waffen-SS in September 1940, only months after the German occupation of the Netherlands. In June 1941 at the age of 19, Boere left to fight on the Eastern Front including, in 1942, service in the Caucasus. In December 1942, he contracted pyelonephritis and was sent back to Maastricht.

== War crimes ==
In 1943, Boere volunteered for the SS-Sonderkommando Feldmeijer, a Dutch Waffen-SS unit. Their primary task was assassinating dissidents, and those retaliating against the Nazi occupation of their country by acts of resistance. By the end, it would include anyone presumed to be connected to a dissident. This operation, codenamed 'Silbertanne' (Silver Fir), was responsible for 54 known killings, three of which Boere admitted to personally committing. Following attacks on German occupation forces and Dutch collaborators, the SS and Police Leader for the Netherlands, Hanns Albin Rauter, ordered the Sonderkommando to assassinate civilians presumed to be in some way connected to the resistance.

Boere's first killing was committed in July 1944 when he and fellow SS member Jacobus Petrus Besteman received orders from the local Sicherheitsdienst (Security Service) office in Breda to murder a pharmacist named Fritz Hubert Ernst Bicknese, a father of twelve. Wearing civilian clothes, Boere and Besteman walked into Bicknese's pharmacy and asked him his identity. Upon a positive reply, Boere fired three shots into Bicknese's upper body, then Besteman fired several more shots as he lay on the floor.

In September 1944, on a Sunday, Boere and Hendrik Kromhout arrived in Voorschoten at the home of Teun de Groot, a bicycle-shop owner and father of five children, who hid fugitives in his shop and was an acquaintance of anti-Nazi activists. As De Groot, still in his pyjamas, fumbled with his wallet to show his ID papers, Boere and Kromhout shot him. They then went to the apartment of Frans Willem Kusters, forced him into their car, and drove out of town. The pair falsely claimed that they had a flat tire, stopped the vehicle and shot Kusters.

== Post-war years ==
In the immediate post-war years, Boere spent two years in an Allied prisoner-of-war camp, where he was interrogated and admitted to the three killings. After release from the camp, Boere initially went into hiding out of fear of being given a lengthy prison sentence, but managed to flee to West Germany. In 1949, a Dutch court sentenced Boere to death in absentia for the murders, for supporting the enemy, and for serving in the army of the enemy.

According to Dutch law, being convicted of serving the army of the enemy automatically leads to the loss of Dutch citizenship. Boere claimed German citizenship on the basis of a so-called Führererlaß, a law promulgated by Hitler providing all SS members with German citizenship. This law remained in force during the 1950s and 1960s in Germany, but was later annulled under pressure from the European Union. From that point on, Boere was stateless, which was confirmed during the trial against him that started in October 2009. However, the German government refused to extradite him. West Germany was responsible for prosecuting war criminals, but Boere was never brought to trial there.

The Dutch government repeatedly sought Boere's extradition. In 1983, a German court refused the Dutch request to hand Boere over to the Dutch authorities on the grounds that he might have German citizenship, and Germany, at that time, did not permit extraditing its own nationals. In 2007, a court in Aachen ruled that Boere could serve his sentence in Germany, but an appeals court in Cologne overturned the ruling, saying that the 1949 conviction was invalid because Boere was unable to present a defence. Boere's case attracted a great deal of public attention and, in 2007, the opposition in the Dutch parliament brought the case up with the Ministry of Justice. Besteman, Boere's partner in the Bicknese slaying, served time in prison in the Netherlands for his war crimes.

On 14 April 2008, the state prosecution in Dortmund announced it was preparing to file charges against Boere. On 8 January 2009, the State Court of Aachen ruled that Boere was medically unfit and did not have to stand trial in the case. The Provincial Court of Appeal in Cologne ruled on 7 July 2009 that Boere was fit for trial, overturning the lower court's ruling. Following a judicial review by the German Federal Constitutional Court, it was decided not to accept Boere's appeal and that Boere was indeed fit to stand trial. However, according to the court he would be under medical supervision, being provided with a doctor for the length of the trial. The trial started on 28 October 2009, at Aachen's regional court.

In 2009, Boere lived in an old-age home in his birth town of Eschweiler. He was not taken into custody for the trial against him. In an interview with Der Spiegel, he said, "I'm not interested in what happened back then." In a documentary by Dutch journalists Rob van Olm and Jan Louter, who were the first to bring Boere to the attention of the public, he did admit to some feeling of remorse and stated he has confessed his crimes to a priest, and prayed for his victims. On 23 March 2010, he was sentenced to life in prison. His defence, that he would have been shot had he disobeyed orders (sometimes known as the 'Nuremberg Defense'), was rejected. Following the ruling of the court, Boere's solicitors announced that they would appeal the judgment.

After his appeal was rejected, Boere began serving his life sentence on 16 December 2011 at the age of 90. Boere died on 1 December 2013 while in prison custody at Fröndenberg.
