= Gregor Formanek =

Romanian German Nazi soldier (1924–2025)

- Born: 18 September 1924; Peregu Mare, Kingdom of Romania
- Died: 2 April 2025 (aged 100); Romania
- Military career
- Service years: 1943-1945
- Rank: Oberschütze
- Unit: 3rd Company of the Guard Battalion
- Conflicts: World War II

Gregor Formanek (18 September 1924 – 2 April 2025) was a Romanian German Nazi soldier during World War II who was a guard at the Sachsenhausen concentration camp in Oranienburg, Germany. In 2023, Gregor was investigated for war crimes but was deemed unfit to stand trial for health reasons and died, aged 100.

== Early life ==
Gregor was born in a village in Romania and later moved to Arad. His father was a tailor who died shortly after his birth. Gregor worked as an errand boy and a pastry chef.

== World War II and imprisonment ==
Gregor was drafted into the Waffen-SS in early July 1943 and became a guard at the Sachsenhausen concentration camp from July 1943 to February 1945. Following the war, Gregor moved to Fürstenwalde/Spree but was arrested in November 1946 by the Soviet Military Administration in Germany. On 10 June 1947, Gregor was sentenced to 25 years of hard labor for crimes against humanity and was sent to Bautzen Prison. However, Gregor only served eight years and was released in September 1956.

== Life after prison ==
Following his release, he became a confectioner in Maintal and a security guard in a factory in Offenbach am Main. Gregor retired in 1989 and became an official German citizen. In September 2023, Gregor, aged 99, was tried for 3,300 cases of abetting murders while he was a guard at Sachsenhausen. However, he was deemed unfit to stand trial due to medical reasons and the case was overturned by the Frankfurt Higher Regional Court in December 2024. On 2 April 2025, Formanek died, aged 100.
