= List of denaturalized former citizens of the United States =

This is a list of denaturalized former citizens of the United States, that is, those who became citizens through naturalization and were subsequently stripped of citizenship. In the cases of Solomon Adler and Bhagat Singh Thind, they subsequently obtained United States citizenship. Frank Walus's nationality was restored after doubts emerged as to the accuracy of the complaints against him and his conviction was quashed.

According to a February 2, 2011 release from the United States Department of Justice, since 1979, the federal government has stripped 107 people of citizenship for alleged involvement in war crimes committed during World War II through the efforts of the Office of Special Investigations (OSI). An unabridged 600-page Justice Department report obtained by The New York Times in 2010 stated, "More than 300 Nazi persecutors have been deported, stripped of citizenship or blocked from entering the United States since the creation of the O.S.I." The Los Angeles Times reported in 2008 that five such denaturalized men could not be deported as no country would accept them, and that four others had died while in the same situation. War criminals from other conflicts, such as the Yugoslav Wars, have also had their citizenship stripped after their involvement in war crimes became known.

Others have been stripped of their citizenship for more mundane crimes; unless otherwise noteworthy, these people are not included on this list. Some of the people on the list below agreed after legal consultation and/or Department of State communications to give up their United States citizenship/nationality in order to avoid legal prosecution and/or exhaustive deportation/removal proceedings, which does not constitute voluntary relinquishment of citizenship as contrasted with the list of former United States citizens who relinquished their nationality.

== List ==
Key of reasons

Hiding World War II crimes or association with the Nazis
Serious crimes, suspicion of spying, or association with terrorists
All other reasons

| Name | Reason | Denaturalization date | Status |
|---|---|---|---|
| Abu al-Dahab, Khaled | Convicted and sentenced to 15 years in prison for being a member of a terrorist organization and trying to overthrow the Egyptian government | 2017 | Lives in Egypt |
| Adeneye, Ibraheem | Convicted of conspiracy to commit marriage fraud, naturalization fraud, and making a false statement to a federal agency. Adeneye indicated that he was engaged in brokering sham marriages between Nigerian nationals and U.S. citizens so that the Nigerians could obtain immigration benefits, ultimately leading to U.S. citizenship. In return, the U.S. citizen "spouses" received cash payments to assist the Nigerians in the deception. | 2010 | U.S. District Judge Kenneth Hoyt sentenced Adeneye to the time he has already served in prison. The judge granted the government's motion to strip Adeneye of his U.S. citizenship. Adeneye became an alien subject to removal from the United States to Nigeria. |
| Adler, Solomon (1909–1994) | Government economist under investigation as a communist spy. Moved to Britain and was denaturalized after his passport expired. | Circa 1952 | |
| Alegre, Renzo William | Convicted of possessing child sexual abuse material. During legal proceedings Alegre stated he had possessed it since around a year before his 2020 arrest. He had been granted citizenship in 2019, having answered "no" to a question asking if he had committed a crime he had not been arrested for. | January 20, 2026 | He was sentenced to four years in prison followed by 20 years of supervised release for the CSAM charges in 2020. In 2025 he was sentenced to 150 days of home detention and one year of probation for unlawfully procuring citizenship. |
| Almallah, Rasmi Khader | Became a permanent resident via a 1981 marriage four days before his student visa expired (later deemed "a green card marriage" by the Immigration and Naturalization Service) and naturalized in 1988. Almallah was stripped of his United States citizenship after coming to the authorities' attention for his connection to the Holy Land Foundation (adjudged to be a Hamas fundraising entity) and also as a former employer of one of the 9/11 bombers. | 2007 | Appealed unsuccessfully to the United States Court of Appeals, Fifth Circuit. Resident of Jordan, where he is a member of the Jordanian Senate. |
| Artishenko, Basil (1923–1989) | Nazism: Member of Nazi-controlled police in Khoiniki (present-day Chojniki, Belarus), accused of helping execute about 100 unarmed people. | October 11, 1984 | Not deported from the United States in a settlement with the government that required him to give up his citizenship and nationality in 1984; died in 1989. |
| Artuković, Andrija (19 November 1899 – 16 January 1988) | Nazism: Croatian Minister of Interior 1941–1942; 1943. | 1986 | Yugoslavia requested extradition 1951; request rejected 1959; deported 1986 to Yugoslavia. Sentenced to death, but not executed due to age and health. Died in a prison hospital in 1988, aged 88. |
| Avdzej, John, aka: Ivan Aŭdzej and Jan Awdziej (1905–1998) | Nazism: Mayor of Stolpce in Nazi-occupied Poland. | March 2, 1984 | Left the country in February 1984 for West Germany, where he renounced his US citizenship as part of a deal to avoid prosecution. Died in 1998. |
| Bartesch, Martin (1926–1989) | Nazism: Failure to disclose his past when he applied for U.S. citizenship: member of the Prinz Eugen Division of the S.S. from 1943–44; while a guard at Mauthausen concentration camp, he shot Gottfried Ochshorn dead when Ochshorn attempted to escape. | May 29, 1987 | Fled to Austria, where he later died. |
| Baumann, Anton (1911–1994) | Nazism: SS Death Head's Battalion guard at Stutthof and Buchenwald concentration camps. | May 17, 1991 | Ordered deported to Germany in 1993, but deportation was never carried out due to his health; died in 1994. |
| Berezowskyj, Walter (né Wolodymyr Berezowskyj; 1924–2010) | Nazism: Guard at Trawniki, Poniatowa, and Gusen concentration camps. | September 15, 1998 | Never deported from the United States due to his health; died in 2010. |
| Bernes, Peter John (né Petras Bernotavičius; 1922–2004) | Nazism: Deputy to Nazi-appointed mayor and police commander Werner Loew in Kupiškis, Lithuania. | May 23, 2002 | Fled to Lithuania in 2002, where he later died. |
| Bless, Anton (1924–2004) | Nazism: SS-Death's Head Battalion guard at Auschwitz concentration camp. | December 18, 1992 | Fled to Germany in 1992, where he died in 2004. |
| Braunsteiner, Hermine (1919–1999) | Nazism: Failure to disclose conviction for war crimes; female concentration camp guard. | 1971 | First Nazi war criminal extradited from the United States to Germany. Sentenced to life imprisonment in 1981, but released in 1996 for health reasons. |
| Breyer, Hans Johann aka Johann Breyer (1925–2014) | Nazism: Waffen SS; also guard at Buchenwald and Auschwitz. | May 1992 | On June 17, 2013 the District Court of Weiden, Germany issued an arrest warrant for Johan Breyer for complicity in the commission of murder while a guard at Auschwitz. He was arrested at his home in Philadelphia one year later and, although he was in frail health at age 89, he was held without bail pending an extradition hearing. Considering his age and that he was a teenager when World War II ended in Europe, he is likely to be the last person pursued by the United States government for his service in the SS. He died in a hospital before his extradition hearing was held. |
| Bučmys, Ildefonsas (1920–2005) | Nazism: Guard at Majdanek concentration camp. | February 17, 2005 | Not deported from the United States in a settlement with the government that required him to give up his U.S. citizenship and nationality in 2005; he died later that same year. |
| Budreika, Joseph (né Juozas Budreika; 1916–1996) | Nazism: Member of the Lithuanian Schutzmannschaft. | May 28, 1996 | Fled to Lithuania on May 14, 1996, in an agreement with the OSI. Died less than a month after arriving in Lithuania. |
| Čiurinskas, Kazys — AKAs: Casimir, Kasimir, Kazimeris, Charlie, Casey Čiurinskas (1918–2001) | Nazism: Member of the Lithuanian Schutzmannschaft. | June 18, 1997 | Fled to Lithuania in 1999 after consenting to deportation. |
| Dailidė, Algimantas (1921–2015) | Nazism: For having "illegally procured" citizenship. Member of the Lithuanian Security Police during World War II. | January 29, 1997 | Fled to Germany in 2004 after being ordered deported. Convicted by a Lithuanian court in 2006, but not imprisoned due to his age. |
| Damrah, Fawaz Mohammed (born 1961) | Imam who was convicted on June 18, 2004, of lying on his naturalization application about his association with three groups classified as terrorist organizations by the U.S. government. | September 23, 2004 | Deported to the Palestinian West Bank in January 2007. |
| Demjanjuk, John (1920–2012) | Nazism: Allegedly concealed being a concentration camp guard at Sobibor, Majdanek, Flossenbürg, and Trawniki, thus committing naturalization fraud. | June 25, 1981. Citizenship restored February 20, 1998. Denaturalized again on February 21, 2002. | Deported to Germany. On July 13, 2009, Demjanjuk was formally charged with 28,060 counts of accessory to murder, one for each person who died at Sobibor during the time he was accused of serving as a guard at the Nazi death camp. On November 30, 2009, Demjanjuk's trial began in Munich. Convicted by Germany in 2011, but released from custody pending his appeal. Died in 2012 before appeal could be heard, thus the Munich District court declared him "presumed innocent". The court confirmed that, in accordance with German law, Demjanjuk's previous interim conviction had been invalidated and that Demjanjuk was without a criminal record. |
| Denzinger, Jakob Frank, a.k.a. Jacob Frank Denzinger (1924-2016) | Nazism: Guard at Mauthausen, St. Georgen, Kraków, and Auschwitz concentration camps. | November 27, 1989 | Fled to West Germany in August 1989; died in Croatia in 2016. |
| Derkacz, Michael, a.k.a. Michael Dercacz (1909–1983) | Nazism: Member of the Ukrainian police who "assisted the Nazis in persecuting civilian Jews." | February 4, 1982 | Derkacz failed to file a notice of appeal against this summary judgment before the time for such an appeal expired, and the revocation of his citizenship thus became final. He died in August 1983 before his deportation hearings were scheduled to begin. |
| Deutscher, Albert [1920-1981] | Nazism: Member of Selbstschutz in Ukraine. | December 17, 1981 | US Justice Department moved to denaturalize him; not proceeded with as Deutscher of Brookfield, Illinois committed suicide by getting run over by a train. |
| Didrichsons, Valdis (1913–1995) | Nazism: Member of Arajs Kommando military unit in Nazi-occupied Latvia. | March 5, 1990 | Never deported from the United States due to his health; died in 1995. |
| Džeko, Edin (born 1972) | War criminal from the former Yugoslavia, who participated in the 1993 murder of Croat non-combatants during the Bosnian War while a soldier in the Bosnian Army. Immigrated to the United States in 2001 under refugee status and lived in the State of Washington and was naturalized as a United States citizen in 2006. Was denaturalized and stripped of his US citizenship in 2018 due to neglecting to mention his service in the Bosnian Army during his naturalization process. | 2018 | Deported to Bosnia and Herzegovina in 2011, where he was sentenced to 12 years for participating in the Trusina massacre while a member of the Bosnian Army. |
| Faris, Iyman | Sentenced to 20 years in prison for aiding and abetting al-Qaida by scoping out the New York’s Brooklyn Bridge as part of a plot to cut through cables that support it. | 2020 | Released from prison in 2020 |
| Fedorenko, Feodor (1907–1987) | Nazism: Guard at Treblinka extermination camp. | March 11, 1981 | Deported to the Soviet Union, where he was sentenced to death for treason and executed in 1987. |
| Firishchak, Osyp, AKAs: Osip, Yosef, Josif, Josyf; Firischtschak, Firiscak, Firischak, Firiszczak, Firischtschuk, Firitschak, Firschak (1919–2012) | Nazism: Member of the Ukrainian Auxiliary Police. | August 30, 2005 | Ordered deported by an immigration judge; appeal denied by Supreme Court on February 21, 2012. Died later that same year. |
| Friedrich, Adam (1921–2006) | Nazism: Guard at Gross-Rosen, Dyhernfurth, and Flossenbürg concentration camps. | February 24, 2004 | Died in July 2006 before deportation proceedings could begin. |
| Galan, Orest (born 1921) | Nazism: Member of the Ukrainian Auxiliary Police | November 2006 | Ordered to leave United States by November 15, 2006 in settlement agreement with the OSI. Returned to Ukraine. |
| Geiser, Anton (1924–2012) | Nazism: SS Death's Head Battalion guard at Sachsenhausen and Buchenwald. | September 29, 2006 | Died in 2012 while appealing his deportation. |
| Gimžauskas, Kazys (1908–2001) | Nazism: Deputy to Aleksandras Lileikis in the Lithuanian Security Police. | June 1996 | Fled to Lithuania in 1993 or 1994. Convicted by a Lithuanian court in 2001, but not imprisoned "after experts concluded he was not mentally fit to take responsibility for his past actions." Died shortly afterward. |
| Goldman, Emma (1869–1940) | Anarchist. | 1919 | Deported on December 21, 1919; landed in Finland on January 17, 1920, and sent from there to the Russian border. |
| Gorshkow, Mikhail (1923–2013) | Nazism: Former interrogator for the Gestapo accused of participating in the murders of about 3,000 people. | July 29, 2002 | Fled to Estonia before being denaturalized. Died in 2013. |
| Gostić, Jadranko (born 1963) | Served in the Zvornik Infantry Brigade of the Bosnian Serb Army from April 1992 until December 1995; concealed involvement in war crimes in Bosnia, including Srebrenica (1995). | June 1, 2010 | Deported to Serbia in 2010 after agreeing to admit to the allegations against him, to be denaturalized and to surrender any claim to lawful permanent resident status. |
| Grabauskas, Joseph J. (né Juozas Grabauskas; 1918–2002) | Nazism: Member of the Lithuanian Schutzmannschaft. | November 1993 | Repatriated to Lithuania as per settlement with the OSI in November 1993; died in 2002. |
| Gudauskas, Vytautas (1918–1997) | Nazism: Member of the Lithuanian Schutzmannschaft. | 1994 | Not deported from the United States in a settlement with the government that required him to give up his U.S. citizenship; died in 1997. |
| Habich, Jakob, a.k.a. Jacob Habich (1913–1995) | Nazism: SS-Death's Head Battalion guard at Lublin and Auschwitz concentration camps. | March 14, 1990 | Never deported from the United States due to his health; died in 1995. |
| Hajda, Bronisław, akas: Bronislaw Hajda and Bruno Hajda (1924–2005) | Nazism: Guard at Trawniki concentration camp and Treblinka labor camp; member of SS Battalion Streibel. | April 9, 1997 | Not deported as no country would accept him; died in 2005. |
| Hammer, Ferdinand (1921–2004) | Nazism: Alleged (never proven) SS guard at Auschwitz and Sachsenhausen concentration camps. | May 22, 1996 | Deported to Austria in 2000, where he died in 2004. |
| Hansl, John, né Johann Hansl (1925–2007) | Nazism: SS Death's Head Battalion guard at the Sachsenhausen and Natzweiler concentration camps. | April 8, 2005 | Died in 2007 in Des Moines, Iowa before deportation proceedings could begin. |
| Hartmann, Martin (born c. 1919) | Nazism: SS-Death Head's Battalion guard at Sachsenhausen concentration camp. | September 2007 | Agreed to permanently depart the United States for Germany on August 31, 2007, in an agreement with the OSI. Believed to be living in Berlin. |
| Haupt, Hans Max and Erna (née Froehling) | Nazism: Parents of Herbert Hans Haupt (naturalized American citizen executed in 1942 after being convicted of spying on U.S. soil for Nazi Germany). Hans Max and Erna (Froehling) Haupt were stripped of their United States citizenship and deported. Hans Max was eventually sentenced to life imprisonment and a fine of $10,000. In 1957, he received a presidential commutation and was deported to Germany, joining his wife Erna who had been deported in 1948. | 1946: Erna (née Froehling) Haupt; 1957: Hans Max Haupt | Deported, albeit whereabouts are unclear as their native Stettin became part of Poland (Szczecin) after the war, and most of the German population had been expelled. |
| Holejko, Nestor {Died 1991} | Nazism: Gestapo Agent Czechoslovakia | 1968 | Postwar Agent for CIA; postwar request for deportation to Czechoslovakia refused; Died March 1991 Florida |
| Hrusitzky, Anatoly (1917–1992) | Nazism: Member of Nazi-controlled police force in Cherny Ostrov, Ukraine | June 29, 1984 | Fled to Venezuela in 1984, where he renounced his United States citizenship and later died in 1992. |
| Hutyrczyk, Sergis (1924–1993) | Nazism: Guard at Koldyczewo concentration camp. | October 2, 1992 | Died in 1993 while appealing his denaturalization. |
| Jean-Baptiste, Lionel (born 1947) | Failure to "establish and maintain 'good moral character'" due to conviction as a drug dealer after application for citizenship, but before his naturalization on April 23, 1996. | circa 2003 | Denied entry to Haiti, his homeland, after denaturalization, on the grounds he had relinquished his Haitian citizenship by becoming a U.S. citizen. Jailed in 2006 for a subsequent drug-related crime. Released on an Order of Supervision after the United States Supreme Court ruled that foreigners who could not be deported could not be detained indefinitely. |
| Jordan, Gilberto (born 1956) | Participated in the Dos Erres massacre, Guatemala in December 1982. | September 16, 2010 | Sentenced to 10 years in prison for naturalization fraud. Released in 2019; deported to Guatemala in 2020. |
| Kairys, Liudas (né Liudvikas Kairys; 1920–1999) and also known as Ludwig Kairys | Nazism: Platoon leader at Treblinka. | December 28, 1984 | Deported to Germany in 1993. Germany suspended its investigation of him in 1999, by which time he had died. |
| Kalymon, John, né Jan Kalymun, a.k.a. Iwan Kalymon (1921–2014) | Nazism: Service in Nazi-affiliated Ukrainische Hilfspolizei (Ukrainian Auxiliary Police) during World War II. The U.S. Justice Department says Kalymon claimed to have shot and killed a Jew in 1942 when Jews were being removed from what is now Lviv, Ukraine. He later denied having done so. | March 29, 2007 | Died in 2014 while awaiting extradition to Germany. |
| Kauls, Juris (1912–2008) | Nazism: Deputy chief and inspector of guards at a concentration camp near Riga, Latvia. | September 8, 1988 | Fled to West Germany in August 1988. Died in Latvia in 2008. |
| Kiršteins, Miķelis (1916–1994) | Nazism: Member of Arajs Kommando military unit in Nazi-occupied Latvia. | December 1991 | Never deported from the United States due to his health; died in 1994. |
| Klimavičius, Jonas (1907–1993) | Nazism: Member of the Lithuanian Schutzmannschaft | November 28, 1988 | Not deported from the United States in a settlement with the government that required him to give up his U.S. citizenship and nationality in 1988; died in 1993. |
| Knauer, Paul (1895–1962) | Nazism: False oath of allegiance due to affiliations with German-American Bund, German-American Citizens Alliance and the German Winter Relief Fund, the last being an official agency of the German government for which German consulates solicited money in the United States. | June 10, 1946 | Regained entry to the United States in 1957. |
| Kolnhofer, Michael (1917–1997) | Nazism: KZ Guard | 1996 | Came to United States in 1952; US Justice Department filed suit to strip him of citizenship; Not denaturalized as he was shot and wounded in Kansas City, Kansas after a gunfight with police in which he fired a pistol at reporters and police December 31, 1996; died of injuries March 1997 age 80. |
| Koréh, Ferenc (1909–1997) | Nazism: Editor of the Hungarian pro-Axis newspaper Székely Nép. | June 28, 1994 | Ordered deported in 1997, but deportation was not carried out due to his health; died later that same year. |
| Kowalchuk, Serge, a.k.a. Serhij Kowalczuk (1920–1998) | Nazism: Senior member of Lithuania militia supporting Nazi persecution of Jews in the town of Lubomyl. | July 1, 1983 | Ordered deported to the Soviet Union, but fled to Paraguay in 1987. Died in 1998. |
| Koziy, Bohdan aka: Bohdan Jozij, Bogdanus Kosij (1923–2003), | Nazism: Member of the Ukrainian Auxiliary Police. | March 29, 1982 | Fled to Costa Rica in 1985, where he died in 2003. |
| Krysa, Wasyl (1925–2004) | Nazism: SS guard at Poniatowa and Gusen concentration camps. | October 5, 2001 | Died in 2004, while appealing his denaturalization. |
| Kuhn, Fritz Julius (1896–1951) | Nazism: Fraud in naturalization process. | June 1, 1943 | Leader of the German American Bund. Jailed as an enemy agent, and deported to Germany in late 1945. |
| Kumpf, Josias (1925–2009) | Nazism: SS-Death's Head Guard at Sachsenhausen and Trawniki. | May 10, 2005 | Deported to Austria in 2009, where he died later that year. |
| Kungys, Juozas, a.k.a. Joseph Kungys (1915–2009) | Making false statements on his visa application. | A district court decision in Kungys' favor was reversed by the Court of Appeals, and he was remanded for denaturalization on June 20, 1986. The decision was overturned by the Supreme Court on May 2, 1988. Kungys agreed to give up his U.S. citizenship in 1988 to avoid deportation. | Died in Hudson County, New Jersey in 2009. |
| Kuras, Andrew, aka: Andrej, Andrij, Andrey, Andreas, Andrzej, Andre Kuras (1922–2007) | Nazism: Guard at Trawniki, Poniatowa, and Dorohucza concentration camps; member of SS-Battalion Striebel. | April 14, 2004 | Never deported from the United States due to his health; died in 2007. |
| Kwoczak, Fedir (aka Fedor Kwoczak; 1921–2003) | Nazism: Guard at Trawniki and Poniatowa concentration camps; participated in liquidation of Warsaw and Białystok ghettos; member of SS-Battalion Streibel. | June 27, 2002 | Died in 2003 while appealing his denaturalization. |
| Linnas, Karl (1919–1987) | Nazism: Commandant of a Nazi concentration camp at Tartu, Estonia, who personally shot civilians. | 1981 | Sentenced to death in absentia by the Soviet Union. Deported in 1987. Not executed due to age and health and died in a Soviet prison hospital. |
| Leili, Stefan (1909–1995) | Nazism: SS-Death's Head guard at Mauthausen concentration camp who admitted shooting a 17-year-old French Jew, Leon Axelroud, during an escape attempt. | December 30, 1986 | Fled to West Germany in August 1986, where he died in 1995. |
| Leprich, Johann (aka John M. Leprich 1925–2013) | Nazism: SS Death's Head Battalion guard at Mauthausen concentration camp. | July 13, 1987 | Arrested in hiding in 2003; released from prison in 2006; as no country would accept him; died in 2013. |
| Li, Xunmei Grace | Convicted of [making] false statements, bigamy, an extramarital affair, and concealment or misrepresentation of facts to get citizenship. | August 2014 | Li was married to two men at the same time, but she contended that one of the marriages was intended to appease the parents of her children's father (Gang Chen) and was not supposed to be real. (Gang Chen, a onetime green card holder, was deported in 2013.) Li was also implicated in the 2007 security breach at an Arizona intelligence center. She worked for a Homeland Security contractor that had installed a facial recognition system in the Arizona Counter Terrorism Information Center, an intelligence-sharing hub run by the state. A Chinese contractor, whom she helped recruit, worked on the program before he quietly left the country in 2007 with equipment and possibly data and other information that belonged to the Phoenix-based company, Hummingbird Defense Systems Inc. |
| Lileikis, Aleksandras (1907–2000) | Nazism: Accused of leading a secret Lithuanian police unit during World War II. | May 24, 1996 | Returned to Lithuania in 1996. War crimes trial suspended in 2000 due to ill health of defendant, who died the same year, aged 93. |
| Lipschis, Hans aka Antanas Lipšys {1919–2016} | Nazism: KZ Auschwitz Guard | Deported in 1983 for "lying about his Nazi past" from Chicago Illinois | Arrested Germany 2013; died 2016 |
| Lytwyn, Wasyl (born 1921) | Nazism: Guard at Trawniki concentration camp; participated in the liquidation of Warsaw ghetto; member of SS-Battalion Streibel. | December 1995 | Repatriated to Ukraine in December 1995 as per agreement with the OSI. |
| Maikovskis, Boļeslavs (1904–1996) | Nazism: Latvian Police Chief | 1987 | Fled in 1987 to West Germany; judged too feeble to be tried for war crimes; died 1996 |
| Mandycz, Iwan (1920–2017) | Nazism: Guard at the Trawniki and Poniatowa camps near Lublin in Nazi-occupied Poland. Became a U.S. citizen in 1955. | February 28, 2005. Appeal dismissed May 22, 2006. | Was not deported due to his health. Died September 6, 2017 Sterling Heights, Michigan age 97 |
| Meneses, Laura (1894-1973) | Activist and wife of Puerto Rican Independence leader Pedro Albizu Campos. | U.S. citizenship revoked in 1948. | Residing in Mexico at the time of her citizenship being revoked, she later self exiled herself to Cuba and became a naturalized Cuban citizen. Died April 15, 1973 in Havana, Cuba |
| Miling, Jakob (1924–2009) | Nazism: SS-Death's Head Battalion guard at Gross-Rosen and Sachsenhausen concentration camps. | August 4, 2003 | Fled to Serbia in September 2002, where he renounced his U.S. citizenship a year later and died in 2009. |
| Milius, Adolph (né Adolfas Milinavičius; 1918–1999) | Nazism: Member of the Lithuanian Security Police. | August 17, 1998 | Fled to Lithuania in 1996, where he died in 1999. |
| Mineikis, Antanas (1918–1997) | Nazism: Stripped of his United States citizenship on suspicion of organizing reprisals during the Nazi occupation of the Baltic region during World War II. | January 1992 | Deported to Lithuania in September 1992, where he died on November 24, 1997. |
| Mozumdar, A. K. (1864–1953) | Claimed to be Caucasian to satisfy a law then in effect restricting naturalization to "free white persons", becoming the first Asian Indian to gain American citizenship. United States v. Bhagat Singh Thind ruled that Asian Indians were not white. | 1923 | Became citizen in 1950 under Luce–Celler Act |
| Munyenyezi, Beatrice (born 1970) | Member of the National Republican Movement for Democracy and Development, assisted in the Rwandan genocide | February 21, 2013 | Released from prison in 2021 and deported to Rwanda, where she was later sentenced to life in prison. |
| Naujalis, Janos [born 1920] | Nazism: Lance Corporal 2nd Auxiliary Police Battalion attached to German 11th Police Reserve Battalion | Ordered deported 1997 | US Justice Department filed suit to denaturalize him in October 1995; deported to native Lithuania March 2001 |
| Negele, Michael (1920–2008) | Nazism: Guard and attack dog handler at Sachsenhausen and Theresienstadt concentration camps. | July 20, 1999 | Not deported as no country would accept him; died in 2008. |
| Negewo, Kelbessa (born 1950) | Convicted in Ethiopia in absentia of torture as a member of the then-ruling Derg. | 2006 | Deported to Ethiopia, where he is serving a life sentence. |
| Odeh, Rasmea (born 1947/1948) | Convicted and sentenced by an Israeli court to life in prison for: (i) her involvement in two terrorist bombings in Jerusalem; and (ii) involvement in an illegal organization, the Popular Front for the Liberation of Palestine (PFLP). Odeh was sentenced to 18 months in federal prison on March 12, 2015, for immigration fraud and for concealing her arrest, conviction, and imprisonment for fatal terrorist bombing. She was stripped of her United States citizenship and deported from the United States to Jordan after serving her time. | 2015 | Deported to Jordan in 2017. |
| Osidach, Wolodymir (1904–1981) | Nazism: Member of the Ukrainian police involved in the persecution of Jews in Rawa Ruska during German occupation. | March 17, 1981 | Died while case was being appealed. |
| Palčiauskas, Kazys (1907–1992) | Nazism: World War II-era mayor of Kaunas, Lithuania, complicit in the persecution of Jews. | February 23, 1983 | Died in St. Petersburg Beach, Florida in 1992 while appealing his deportation. |
| Palij, Jakiw (1923–2019) | Nazism: Failed to disclose he had been a concentration camp guard at the Trawniki concentration camp. | July 31, 2003 | Deported to Germany on 21 August 2018, on the basis of the deportation order issued by the Immigration Court and a special decree issued by the German Federal Ministry of the Interior, Building and Community accepting to take him in. Died in Germany in January 2019. |
| Pasker, Mike (né Mečys Paškevičius; 1901–1993) | Nazism: Failed to disclose his World War II era service in the Nazi-affiliated Lithuanian Security Police from 1941–44 | August 23, 1979 (consented to denaturalization) | Never deported from the United States due to his health; died in 1993. |
| Peláez, Vicky (born 1956) | Pleaded guilty to working in the United States as an unregistered foreign agent for Russia, and agreed to deportation on July 9, 2010, and to never return, in exchange for the U.S. dropping the more serious charge of money laundering and waiving any jail time. Her husband Mikhail Vasenkov; aka Juan Lazaro—who had long passed himself off as a native of Uruguay and denied being Russian—was returned to Russia but Peláez indicated she would return to her native Peru. Her two United States-born children elected to remain in the U.S. | July 2010 | Pelaez indicated she would return to her native Peru. Her two United States-born children elected to remain in the U.S. According to one of her lawyers, Peláez's United States citizenship was "revoked", but did not specify if she had been denaturalized. |
| Popczuk, Michael (1919–1983) | Nazism: Served in a Ukrainian collaborationist police force which participated in the torture, round-up, and murder of Jewish civilians | June 28, 1983 | US Justice Department moved to denaturalize him; not proceeded with as Popczuk of Massachusetts committed suicide by shooting himself in the head with a rifle. |
| Prouty, Nada Nadim (born c. 1970) | Former CIA agent who pleaded guilty two felonies related to a sham (green card) marriage and to one misdemeanor count of unauthorized use of an FBI computer. Renounced all claims to United States citizenship. | 2007 | Granted withholding of deportation/removal due to perceived threat to her life in her native Lebanon; she must comply with an Order of Supervision issued by the Department of Homeland Security. Claims to have received US Citizensip again and moved to UAE. |
| Quintus, Peter (1915–1997) | Nazism: SS guard at Majdanek concentration camp | July 1988 | Never deported from the United States due to his health; died in 1997. |
| Reger, Stefan (1925–2003) | Nazism: Reger, a native of Filipovo, Yugoslavia, was stripped of his United States citizenship due to naturalization fraud related to World War II service in the SS Death's Head Battalion (which he acknowledged) and at Birkenau (which he denied). | September 8, 1988 | Fled to West Germany in 1988, where he died in 2003. |
| Reimer, Jakob, a.k.a. Jack Reimer (1918–2005) | Nazism: Trawniki concentration camp guard. | September 5, 2002 | Died before he could be deported to Germany. |
| Reve, Hiram Cristobal (born 1961) | Committed naturalization fraud when he failed to disclose his July 12, 1995 arrest for sexually assaulting a 14-year-old boy in May 1995 when submitting his naturalization application dated July 27, 1995. United States Attorney for the District of New Jersey Chris Christie (later Governor of New Jersey) successfully concluded that Reve knowingly tried to deceive the federal government in not disclosing his arrest. | January 31, 2003 | Reve presently resides in New Jersey as a legal permanent resident due to the former Wet feet, dry feet policy on repatriating Cuban nationals back to Cuba. |
| Rinkel, Elfriede Lina (Huth) (1922–2018) | Nazism: SS Guard | 2006 | Deported to Germany, where she died in 2018 |
| Rudolph, Arthur (1906–1996) | Nazism: German rocket scientist who worked on the V-2. Renounced citizenship under pressure. | March 25, 1984 | Died in Hamburg, Germany in 1996. |
| Rydlinski, Chester (né Wiatscheslaw Rydlinskis; 1924–1997) | Nazism: Guard and attack dog handler at the Auschwitz concentration camp in Nazi-occupied Poland, the Buchenwald concentration camp in Germany and at Buchenwald's Laura subcamp. | July 21, 1995 | Fled to Germany in late 1994, where he died in 1997. |
| Sawchuk, Dmytro (1924–2004) | Nazism: Guard at Trawniki concentration camp and Bełżec extermination camp; participated in liquidation of Białystok ghetto; member of SS-Battalion Streibel | March 23, 1999 | Fled to Germany in 1999, where he renounced his US citizenship and later died in 2004. |
| Schellong, Conrad (1910–1992) | Nazism: For "concealing his role as a guard and later commander at the Sachsenburg and Dachau Nazi death camps from 1934 to 1939." | September 9, 1982 | Deported to West Germany in 1988, where he later died. |
| Schiffer, Nikolaus (1919–2007) | Nazism: Guard at Sachsenhausen, Hersbruck, Majdanek, and Trawniki concentration camps. | August 25, 1993 (Born in the US, he expatriated himself by serving in the Romanian Army and Waffen SS during World War II.) | Deported to Romania in 2002, where he later died in 2007. |
| Schmidt, Michael (1923–2008) | Nazism: Did not contest the Office of Special Investigations/Justice Department Criminal Division allegation that he participated in the persecution of civilians while serving as an armed guard at the Sachsenhausen concentration camp. | January 3, 1990 | Agreed to permanently depart the United States by December 31, 1992 in an agreement with the OSI. Died in Germany in 2008. |
| Schuk, Mykola (1909–1986) | Nazism: Member of Nazi police force in Ukraine. | November 1, 1985 | Not deported from the United States in a settlement with the government that required him to give up his U.S. citizenship and nationality in 1985; died a year later. |
| Schwinn, Hermann Max, a.k.a. Herman Schwinn (1905–1973) | Nazism: Fraudulently and illegally procured naturalization. He became a United States citizen on July 22, 1932. Leader of the Western Division of the Friends of New Germany and the German-American Bund. | Citizenship canceled on July 15, 1939; on May 10, 1940, judgment affirmed and appeal denied. | Died in 1973 in Florida. |
| Shqaire, Vallmoe | Fraudulently and illegally procured naturalization. He became a United States citizen on November 6, 2008. Failed to mention serving time in an Israeli prison for a 1988 bus bombing and his ties to the Palestine Liberation Organization, then considered a terrorist organization. | Citizenship canceled on April 26, 2019; Will be deported to Jordan. | Awaiting deportation order. |
| Sokolov, Vladimir (aka Vladimir Samarin; 1913–1992) | Nazism: Editor and propaganda writer for the pro-Nazi Russian newspaper Rech. | June 2, 1986 | Fled to Canada in 1988, where he later died. |
| Soobzokov, Tscherim (1924–1985) | Nazism: 1st Lt in the SS; member of North Caucasus Legion; | 1979 | Postwar a spy for the CIA; US Justice Department began investigating suspect in 1974; denaturalization proceedings started in December 1979; dropped after he admitted involvement in North Caucasus Legion; injured by a bomb planted by persons or persons unknown on August 15, 1985; died of injuries on September 6, 1985. |
| Sosa, Jorge (born 1958) | Participated in the Dos Erres massacre, Guatemala in December 1982. | February 10, 2014 | Sentenced to 10 years in prison for naturalization fraud on February 10, 2014. Deported to Canada in 2020 after serving his sentence. In 2017, Canadian government filed a lawsuit to strip him of Canadian citizenship, which was still ongoing as of late 2024 |
| Steimer, Mollie (born 1897, Tsarist Russia – died 1980, Mexico), et al. (3 co-defendants) | Anarchist; arrested in 1918 for violating the Espionage Act of 1917 | November 1, 1922, to Russia along with three co-defendants | Received a 15-year sentence in prison. Samuel Lipman (co-defendant) was executed on the orders of Stalin, Hyman Lachowsky (co-defendant) was killed by the Nazis, and Jacob Abrams (co-defendant) settled in Mexico, as did Steimer. |
| Sproģis, Elmārs (Elmar Sprogis; 26 November 1914, Latvia – 10 July 1991, New York) | Nazism: Assistant Chief of Police (Latvia) World War II; Emigrated to US 1950; 1983 Justice Department OSI moved to revoke citizenship on grounds he had concealed participation in killing of Jews in 1941; | October 1983 | "Exonerated" on May 18, 1984; residence firebombed September 6, 1985. Died 10 July 1991 |
| Stelmokas, Jonas (né Stelmokevičius; 1916–1998) | Nazism: Lithuanian officer in the 3rd Company of the 3rd Battalion of the Lithuanian] Schutzmannschaft "... acquiesced in the murder and persecution of Jews and other unarmed civilians in Lithuania. Around August 1944, at the time the German occupation of Lithuania ended, Stelmokas entered the German Air Force (Luftwaffe) in the 91st Light Flak Replacement Unit". | August 2, 1995 (original decision); November 12, 1996 (appeal rejected by the United States Court of Appeals) US Justice Deportment filed suit to denaturalize him June 1997 | Died in Pennsylvania in 1998 while appealing his deportation. |
| Szehinskyj, Theodor (1924–2014) | Nazism: SS Death's Head Battalion guard at Gross-Rosen, Sachsenhausen and Nazi camp in Warsaw concentration camps. | July 24, 2000 | Remained in the United States until his death in 2014, as no country was found that would accept him. |
| Szendi, Joseph (né József Szendi; 1915–2004) | Nazism: Member of Royal Hungarian Gendarmerie, a paramilitary unit which deported Hungarian Jews to Nazi-occupied Poland. | June 18, 1993 | Fled to Hungary in 1993 in an agreement with the Justice Department; died in 2004. |
| Tannenbaum, Jacob (c. 1912–1989) | Nazism: Jewish kapo at Goerlitz concentration camp. | February 4, 1988 | Never deported from the United States due to his health; died in 1989. |
| Theodorovich, George (né Jurij Theodorowytsch; born 1922) | Nazism: Member of Nazi-controlled police force in Ukraine | January 27, 1984 | Ordered deported to the Soviet Union, but fled to Paraguay on December 18, 1988. |
| Thind, Bhagat Singh (1892-1967) | Second attempt at citizenship. Naturalization revoked for being of Asian descent, based on then caselaw. | December 13, 1918 and February 19, 1923 (two separate occasions) | Thind remained in the U.S. and eventually qualified under U.S. law to become a citizen, which he did in 1936 (his third attempt). |
| Tittjung, Anton (1924–2012) | Nazism: Guard at Mauthausen concentration camp. | December 14, 1990 | Not deported as no country would accept him; died in 2012. |
| Trifa, Valerian, a.k.a. Viorel Trifa (1914–1987) | Nazism: Former member of the fascist Iron Guard of Romania. He was Detroit Archbishop of the Romanian Orthodox Church until the Department of Justice's OSI investigation, which began in 1975. Renounced U.S. citizenship. | August 26, 1980 | Fled to Portugal, where he died in 1987. |
| Virkutis, Antanas (1913–1993) | Nazism: Warden of Šiauliai prison in Nazi-occupied Lithuania | April 1988 | Never deported from the United States due to his health; died in 1993. |
| von Bolschwing, Otto Albrecht Alfred aka Otto von Bolschwing [1909-1982] | Nazism: SS Captain and advisor to Adolf Eichmann. | December 22, 1981 | Gave up citizenship but Never deported from the United States due to his health; died in March 1982. |
| Walus, Frank, akas: Franzl Walus, Franciszek Walus, Fritz Wulecki (1922–1994) | Nazism: Alleged to have worked with the Gestapo | 1974 | Citizenship stripped from him, but later restored. |
| Wasylyk, Mykola (1923–2010) | Nazism: Concentration camp guard at Trawniki and Budzyn. | July 13, 2001 | Remained in the U.S. after denaturalization as no other country would accept him. He died in 2010. |
| Wieland, Josef (1908–1992) | Nazism: SS-Death's Head guard at Mauthausen concentration camp. | June 19, 1986 | Fled to West Germany in 1986, where he died in 1992. |
| Wittje, Joseph (1920–2006) | Nazism: Waffen-SS guard at Sachsenhausen concentration camp. | August 27, 2004 | Died in 2006 before deportation hearings could begin. |
| Wojciechowski, Chester (1920–2003) | Nazism: Guard at the Majdanek concentration camp. | October 5, 1987 | Fled to West Germany, where he died in 2003. |
| Yazdi, Ebrahim (1931–2017) | Served as the Iranian Deputy Prime Minister (1979), Minister of Foreign Affairs (1979) and Member of Parliament (1980–1984) | 1979 | |
| Yetisen, Sammy Rasema | Born Rasema Handanovic. War criminal from the former Yugoslavia, who participated in the 1993 murder of Croat non-combatants during the Bosnian War while a soldier in the Bosnian Army. Immigrated to the United States under refugee status in 1998 and was naturalized in 2002, living in Oregon. She was denaturalized and stripped of her US citizenship for concealing her wartime service in the Bosnian Army during her naturalization process. | 2019 | Deported to Bosnia and Herzegovina and pled guilty in the Bosnian judiciary to participating in the Trusina massacre of 1993 while an active soldier in the Bosnian Army. Through a plea bargain she received a reduced sentence from a Bosnian court of five years and six months' imprisonment, and returned to Oregon after completing the sentence in European prison. |
| Zajančkauskas, Vladas (1915–2013) | Nazism: Trawniki concentration camp guard who participated in the Nazi operation at the Warsaw Ghetto. | January 26, 2005 | Ordered deported by an immigration judge; appeal denied by Supreme Court on November 18, 2010. |
| Ziegler, John (né Johann Ziegler; 1907–1997) | Nazism: SS-Death's Head guard at Stutthof, Kauen, and Gotenhafen concentration camps. | 1991 | Fled to Austria in 1991; died in 1997. |
| Zultner, Martin (1912–1997) | Nazism: Guard at Schwechat, Floridsdorf, and Mödling, three subcamps of Mauthausen in Austria. | October 23, 1990 | Moved to Austria in 1975, where he renounced his US citizenship in 1990 and later died in 1997. |

== See also ==
- Deportation and removal from the United States
  - Deportation of Americans from the United States
