= Allan Ryan (attorney) =

American lawyer (1945–2023)

- Born: Allan A. Ryan Jr. July 3, 1945; Cambridge, Massachusetts, U.S.
- Died: January 26, 2023 (aged 77); Norwell, Massachusetts, U.S.
- Occupations: Attorney, author, law professor

Allan A. Ryan Jr. (July 3, 1945 – January 26, 2023) was an American attorney, author and a law professor at Harvard University, where he taught from 1985 until his death. He is best known for his work as a Justice Department lawyer who in the early 1980s identified and prosecuted dozens of Nazi collaborators living in the United States, earning him a reputation as America's foremost Nazi hunter.

== Biography ==
Ryan was born in Cambridge, Massachusetts, on July 3, 1945, the oldest of eight children of Allan Ryan, an accountant, and Anne (Conway) Ryan, a homemaker.

Ryan graduated from Dartmouth College and magna cum laude from the University of Minnesota Law School. He served as a law clerk to Justice Byron White of the Supreme Court of the United States and as a captain in the U.S. Marine Corps. In the U.S. Justice Department, he was Assistant to the Solicitor General and from 1980 to 1983 Director of the Office of Special Investigations, Criminal Division, responsible for the investigation and prosecution of Nazi war criminals in the United States. From 1985 until his death, he was an attorney at Harvard University, first in the Office of General Counsel and from 2001 as Director of Intellectual Property, Harvard Business School Publishing.

Ryan was the author of Klaus Barbie and the United States Government: A Report to the Attorney General (Government Printing Office, 1983), Quiet Neighbors: Prosecuting Nazi War Criminals in America (Harcourt Brace Jovanovich, 1984), Yamashita's Ghost: War Crimes, MacArthur's Justice and Command Accountability (University Press of Kansas, 2012), and The 9/11 Terror Cases: Constitutional Challenges in the War Against Al Qaeda (University Press of Kansas, 2015). He was historical advisor to the PBS documentary Elusive Justice: The Search for Nazi War Criminals (2011) and co-producer of PBS documentary Dead Reckoning (2018).

Ryan taught the law of war at Boston College Law School from 1990, and he was on the faculty of the Harvard University Division of Continuing Education, where he taught the courses War Crimes, Genocide and Justice; The Constitution and the Media; and Intellectual Property.

Ryan was a member of the Naval War College Foundation, the U.S. Naval Institute, and the Society for Military History, and served on the National Commission of the Anti-Defamation League. He formerly served on the Board of Directors of its New England Region of the League, where he was chair of its Civil Rights Committee. From 2016 until his death, he served as chairman of the Board of Veterans Legal Services, which provides legal assistance to economically disadvantaged veterans in Massachusetts.

Ryan died from a heart attack at his home in Norwell, Massachusetts, on January 26, 2023, at the age of 77.

== Director of the OSI ==
The Office of Special Investigations (OSI) was created in 1979 to identify and expel from the United States those who assisted Nazis in persecuting "any person because of race, religion, national origin, or political opinion." This involved the challenging tasks for decades-old crimes of gathering, verifying, and presenting in court eyewitness and documentary evidence that was incomplete and scattered around the world. Much of this evidence was then in Eastern Europe, behind the Iron Curtain. OSI received The Elie Wiesel Award, the highest award of the United States Holocaust Memorial Museum. The award was established in 2011 and recognizes "internationally prominent individuals whose actions embody the Museum's vision of a world where people confront hate, prevent genocide, and promote human dignity."

=== Early cases ===
As an assistant to the US solicitor general, Ryan had been arguing cases before the Supreme Court on behalf of the government. By chance, he was assigned a case already lost by the Immigration and Naturalization Service (INS) to strip Feodor Fedorenko of his US citizenship and deport him. Fedorenko was alleged to have been a guard at various places, including a Jewish ghetto and Treblinka extermination camp where a total of 800,000 Jews were murdered by the Nazis. Ryan considered himself a prosecutor rather than a Nazi-hunter, but he came to believe the case was important and recommended that it be pursued. He won the case in the court of appeals, and the Supreme Court later upheld the appeals court's ruling. That case, Fedorenko v. United States, became OSI's seminal case that set important legal precedent and led to Ryan's being asked to serve as the second Director of OSI, following the brief tenure of Walter Rockler. Federenko was later convicted of treason in the Soviet Union, sentenced to death, and executed.

Ryan led the organization during its formative years, from 1980 to 1983, navigating a difficult political landscape, establishing the importance of historical research in addition to criminal investigation and winning precedent-setting cases. OSI's approach was to identify those who met the criteria for being persecutors, determine whether they had lied about their wartime activities when applying for entry into the U.S or for U.S. citizenship and, if so, strip them of their citizenship and deport them. Initial leads came passively from existing INS cases, Jewish organizations also searching for war criminals, and individuals by chance coming across their former tormentors. Ryan's emphasis on historical research soon enabled OSI to become proactive in developing leads and ultimately becoming a resource for Holocaust and other World War II research well beyond OSI's mandate to prosecute. The quality of Ryan's report on Klaus Barbie, in the words of OSI historian Judith Feigin, "helped establish OSI as an essential resource for persons dealing with World War II issues."

As the work began, Ryan had to contend with widespread disagreement on many important issues. Some felt the effort to expel World War II war criminals was important both to achieve justice and to set precedent for the future, while others felt that the time had passed for pursuit of these aims. Some Justice Department officials felt OSI should have a Jewish Director, while others did not want the office to be viewed as a Jewish organization and favored Ryan in part because he was not Jewish. Eastern European nationality groups opposed OSI's use of evidence from the USSR, which had an interest in discrediting Baltic State, Ukrainian, and other emigre groups and might well provide false information and forged documents to achieve their aims. These emigre groups also challenged the use of the lower standard of evidence involved in civil trials compared to criminal trials, even though citizenship revocation and deportation were civil issues and US law at the time did not provide for criminal penalties for crimes committed on foreign soil unless against US citizens. The emigres also feared that OSI might seek to deport anyone who had lied on their entry applications, not just the wartime persecutors that Ryan sought to expel. In contrast, Jewish groups were pressing for more determined action by OSI than INS had demonstrated. It became clear that leading OSI was going to involve a lot of public relations work as well as research and prosecution.

From the beginning, Ryan had to deal with major controversies. In contrast to the Fedorenko case, which the INS had lost and Ryan had won on appeal, the Walus case had been lost on appeal by the U.S. Attorney's Office in Chicago with the court ordering a retrial and Ryan, by then deputy director of OSI, counseled against pursuing the case. The documentary evidence was weak and the eyewitnesses, forty years after the fact, were unconvincing. It was even possible that this was a case of mistaken identity. According to Judith Feigin, OSI's historian, it took courage in 1981 for Ryan to dismiss the Walus case. Frank Walus had come to the attention of INS in 1974 by a letter from Simon Wiesenthal, a highly respected Holocaust survivor and acclaimed Nazi hunter. Several Holocaust survivors had traveled to America from Israel and emotionally confronted Walus, their former tormentor, in court. Furthermore, Ryan had not yet won the confidence of the Jewish community, whose support could be important for OSI success, and he could expect a negative reaction for his not pursuing Walus. Ultimately, however, Ryan's track record "won the respect and admiration of the Jewish community [and he] was appointed to the Executive Committee of the New England Region of the Anti-Defamation League- the first non-Jew ever to be so honored."

By the middle of 1984, forty cases had been filed by OSI against alleged war criminals then living in America. Through following years, OSI successfully prosecuted over 130 other cases involving persons complicit in Nazi war crimes but later living quietly in America. Three such cases seeking expulsion reached the Supreme Court. Most cases involved camp guards who had beaten or executed prisoners or had led them to places of execution. Juozas Kungys, for example, was prosecuted because OSI determined he had "rounded up and transported thousands of Jews to an execution site, distributed firearms and ammunition to an execution squad, forced the victims into a mass grave, shot some of them, and exhorted the execution squad to do the same.

=== Demjanjuk Controversy ===
A highly controversial and widely publicized case involved Ivan (aka John) Demjanjuk, who was ultimately convicted in 2011 in Germany as an accessory in the murder of 28,000 Jews while a guard at Sobibor extermination camp in occupied Poland. This conviction was the culmination of determined prosecutorial efforts over thirty years in three countries. Professor Lawrence Douglas, who wrote a detailed history of the Demjanjuk case, concluded that in spite of the serious missteps along the way, the German verdict brought the case "to a worthy and just conclusion."

The controversy stemmed from OSI's initially mistaking Demjanjuk's identity and proceeding with denaturalization action against him in the belief that he was the notorious, sadistic guard known as "Ivan the Terrible" at Treblinka extermination camp. OSI had obtained conflicting evidence from documents and eyewitnesses as to Demjanjuk's description and location during the war that led one member of the prosecution team to recommend not pursuing the case. Others including Ryan were convinced at the time that Demjunjuk was "Ivan" and the case went forward. At his denaturalization trial in 1981, Demjanjuk was judged to be the Trablinka guard "Ivan" and the U.S. citizenship he had obtained in 1958 was revoked. In separate subsequent proceedings, it was further determined that he was deportable and extraditable. At the request of the government of Israel, he was extradited to face trial there for war crimes. In 1988, after a fourteen-month trial, it was again determined that Demjanjuk was "Ivan the Terrible." He was found guilty of war crimes and sentenced to death.

During the period that Demjunjuk's Israeli conviction was on appeal, the Soviet Union collapsed. New evidence became available in 1991 from behind the former Iron Curtain that strongly indicated that Demjunjuk had not been at Trablinka (and therefore was not "Ivan the Terrible") but had been at other notorious camps, including Trawniki, Sobibor, Flossenburg and Majdaek. Demjunjuk's defense team in the U.S. used this new evidence, along with allegations of improprieties by the OSI, to overturn both the denaturalization decision, reached during Ryan's tenure as OSI Director, as well as the later extradition decision. In 1993, the Israeli Supreme court also acquitted Demjanjuk of charges related to the actions of "Ivan the Terrible," even though there was considerable evidence of his being involved with war crimes at other camps. Although no longer a U.S. citizen, he was returned to the United States.

In obtaining this favorable result for their client, Demjanjuk's defense teams in the U.S. and Israel variously accused OSI of improperly withholding evidence that should have been disclosed because it was potentially useful to their client, intentionally presenting falsified evidence, and improperly influencing witnesses, charges Ryan and others at OSI denied. These accusations prompted six investigations looking for evidence of prosecutorial or ethical misconduct. They were conducted by three separate bodies between 1987 and 1993. First, the Appeals Court appointed a Special Master, Federal District Court Judge Thomas A. Wiseman, Jr., who conducted a six-month inquiry resulting in a 210-page unpublished report. Second, the local Bar reviewed the conduct of both Ryan and the attorney assigned to the case. Third, the Department of Justice (DOJ) Office of Professional Responsibility (OPR) conducted four internal inquiries. One was at the request of OSI itself and another at the request of Demjanjuk's defense team. Another was at the request of Chief Justice Gilbert S. Merritt, Jr., who had presided during the Demjanjuk denaturalization hearing and questioned Ryan's conduct, speculating that "Jewish special interest groups" had "obviously influenced Ryan and the OSI." All three investigative bodies concluded that there was no intentional wrongdoing.

The Appeals Court, however, while accepting the factual findings of the Special Master regarding intentional wrongdoing, held that the government had defined too narrowly its duty to disclose potentially useful documents to the defense. Accordingly, in 1998, the Appeals Court rescinded its extradition order. In subsequent actions, based on the determination of the Appeals Court, Demjanjuk's deportation order was nullified and his U.S. citizenship restored. Further, the Court ruled that, because the civil actions regarding denaturalization and deportation were based upon allegations of criminal activity on the part of a defendant, henceforth OSI would have to use the more exacting rules of disclosure required by criminal proceedings. Lawrence Douglas characterized the court's action as "surprising" and particularly remarkable since the court "admonished the OSI for failing to satisfy a standard that the court had only just imposed."

Undeterred and using the documents that became available since 1991 which helped Demjanjuk establish he was not Ivan The Terrible, OSI filed a new complaint in 1999 seeking denaturalization, now based upon Demjanjuk's service at Trawniki, Sobibor, Majdanek, and Flossenburg. For a second time, Demjanjuk was stripped of his citizenship. Through multiple appeals and other legal maneuvering, Demjanjuk's defense team successfully delayed his deportation, this time to Germany, until 2009 and delayed conclusion of his trial there until 2011. After 91 days of trial, he was convicted on 16 counts as an accessory to the murder of over 28,000 Jews at Sobibor extermination camp during 1943. Accordingly, he was sentenced to five years in prison.

Again Demjanjuk appealed but died before the appeal was heard. His attorneys unsuccessfully appealed to have his citizenship restored posthumously. His relatives successfully arranged for his burial in Ohio, near where he used to live.

The controversy surrounding Demjanjuk's mistaken identity received extensive publicity in the U.S. His ultimate conviction for war crimes two decades later in Germany did not. As a result, according to OSI historian Judith Feigin, "many members of the public still know of OSI [only] as the mistaken prosecutor of Ivan the Terrible."

=== High-Ranking Officials and Propagandists ===
Although most suspected war criminals that entered the U.S. after World War II were relatively low ranking prison guards, OSI under Ryan also prosecuted prominent Nazi collaborators.

Andrija Artuković was a senior official in occupied Croatia. His decrees called for internment and execution of "undesirables" such as Serbs Jews, Gypsies, Orthodox Christians, and Communists. Hundreds of thousands of Serbs and Jews were massacred as a result. He was extradited to Yugoslavia in 1986, tried, convicted, and sentenced to death.

Otto von Bolschwing was the chief SS intelligence officer in Romania and later in Greece. He worked with Adolf Eichmann to devise programs that persecuted Germany's Jews. After the war, he worked for the Central Intelligence Agency before emigrating to America. Rather than contest the OSI complaint against him, Bolschwing agreed to surrender his citizenship. He died before deportation proceedings were initiated.

Karl Linnas was head of an Estonian concentration camp during the Nazi occupation. Kneeling prisoners were shot on his orders. The Soviets convicted him in absentia for having taken an active part in 12,000 murders and wanted him extradited. After extensive legal proceedings, Linnas was ultimately sent to the U.S.S.R where he died before he could be retried there.

Valerian Trifa was a propagandist and member of Romania's fascist Iron Guard. His anti-semitic writings provoked riots resulting in torture and murder of hundreds of Jews. As OSI was preparing to take him to trial, Trifa surrendered his citizenship and was ultimately deported to Portugal where he died of natural causes.

=== Report on Klaus Barbie ===
In 1983, near the end of Ryan's Directorship at OSI, he was asked to investigate the relationship between Klaus Barbie and the U.S. government following World War II. As Gestapo chief in Lyon, France, Barbie personally beat and tortured men, women, and children, reportedly laughing as he did so. His methods included whipping, electric shocks, breaking arms and legs, and sexual abuse, earning him the title "Butcher of Lyon." He also deported Jewish children to Auschwitz concentration camp, where they were murdered. The question was, as America's focus shifted from the threat from Nazis to the threat from communism, was Barbie recruited to serve as a U.S. agent in Germany and, when French officials sought to bring Barbie to justice, did the U.S. government help him escape to Bolivia.

Ryan's thoroughly researched report to the Attorney General concluded that "officers of the United States government were directly responsible for protecting a person wanted by the government of France on criminal charges and in arranging his escape from the law." Ryan felt that the initial decision for the U.S. Government to use Barbie during Cold War counter-intelligence work, while reprehensible in light of his war-crimes, might be defended in light of national security interests. Doing so was no different from what other World War II victor nations were doing at the time, and it may have been done without thorough knowledge of Barbie's atrocities in Lyon. After those atrocities became well publicized, however, Ryan regarded it as indefensible for U.S. Counter Intelligence Corp. personnel to lie to higher U.S. authorities and help Barbie escape Europe to Bolivia rather than honor an outstanding French warrant for his arrest.

As a result of Ryan's report and personal recommendation, the U.S. government made a formal apology to France for enabling Barbie to escape French justice for thirty-three years. Barbie was ultimately found in Bolivia, extradited to France, convicted of crimes against humanity, and sentenced to life imprisonment.

Although some politicians and commentators did not agree with all the conclusions or believe the apology was justified, reaction to Ryan's report was generally highly favorable, both in the U.S. and abroad. The Washington Post applauded the report's "candor and balance" and regarded it as "a credit to the Justice Department and particularly to its principal author, Allan A. Ryan, Jr." The New York Times believed the report would be one that "serves history and invites us to learn from it." The Times further wrote "How rare it is for a proud and powerful nation to admit shabby behavior." French and German newspapers also praised the report, with one noting America's "powerful and impressive capacity for democratic self-purging."

=== Quiet Neighbors ===
Ryan recorded his experiences at OSI in his book, Quiet Neighbors: Prosecuting Nazi War Criminals in America. He notes with irony that, immediately after World War II, because America did not want to dwell upon the Holocaust or Nazi war criminals, and because the emerging Cold War presented new threats, and because of newly formulated U.S. immigration policies, as the New York Times reported, it had become easier for former Nazis and their collaborators to immigrate legally to the U.S. than for Holocaust survivors. Ryan concluded that for decades after Americans sacrificed to defeat Hitler, they were content to turn a blind eye as Hitler's henchmen became their neighbors. The book, Ryan states, is not just about ex-Nazis and their collaborators but, more importantly, it is a book about America.

== Consulting For Rwanda ==
The experience gained and reputation earned by OSI in general and Ryan in particular was called upon following the Rwanda genocide of 1994. In 1995, Ryan was asked to consult for the Rwandan Government on how to prosecute those responsible for the genocide. In 2003, the International Criminal Tribunal for Rwanda used principles from cases prosecuted by Ryan and OSI to convict propagandists for inciting genocide.

== War Crimes, Genocide, and Justice ==
Ryan's personal experience at OSI, addressing how the power of office could appropriately be used to pursue atrocities, led him to focus his academic work on war crimes, genocide, and justice. A consistent theme of his work is the importance of maintaining the integrity of the law as a shield against injustice, even when prosecuting enemies. In addition to Quiet Neighbors, he has authored two books dealing with troubling and controversial U.S. legal cases, ultimately decided by the U.S. Supreme Court, that appeared to be inconsistent with the law of war and any sense of justice. They address issues central to American jurisprudence, such as checks and balances between our three branches of government, accountability for the proper use of both military and prosecutorial power, the right to be represented by counsel, the right to petition courts challenging incarceration, standards for the admissibility of evidence, and the use of trials before military commanders rather than experienced judges.

=== Yamashita's Ghost ===
Ryan critically examined General Douglas MacArthur's targeting a Japanese General after World War II using a hand-picked military commission and disregarding customary rules of evidence to send him to the gallows. The verdict, ultimately upheld by the Supreme Court, found General Tomoyuki Yamashita accountable for atrocities committed in the Philippines during the closing months of the Pacific war simply because the troops were nominally under his command. There was no evidence that Yamashita committed crimes or ordered others to do so or was in a position to prevent them or even suspected they were about to happen. This set a far-reaching precedent for command responsibility that has never been undone. However, American Generals were not held to this standard in subsequent wars in Vietnam (My Lai), Iraq (Abu Ghraib), and Afghanistan (Bagram).

=== 9/11 Terror Cases ===
Ryan critically examined how President Bush and his small "war council" (Cheney et al.) assumed sweeping powers after 9/11 to deny individuals, including some US citizens, the benefit of fundamental legal protections. In Ryan's view these actions, that were ultimately found to be incompatible with our Constitution and with American rule of law, and were taken in the misguided belief that the institutions that had served America well, in peace and war, for 200 years would be insufficient after 9/11. Through detailed analysis of four legal cases, Ryan chronicles how the Supreme Court and other courts restored an appropriate balance of power among our three branches of government.

=== Defining Genocide ===
Professor Ryan has emphasized the importance from a legal point of view of clearly defining "genocide", proposing what it is and what it is not. In the Harvard University Gazette in August 2000 he said, "The really rapidly developing law today is in this question of what constitutes genocide, what constitutes crimes against humanity? How can we devise effective judicial procedures for enforcing that law? So when I call the course War Crimes, Genocide, and Justice, it really is an attempt to look at those three elements. Is it possible to address them? Is there really any such thing as justice when you're talking about 6 million people who were killed because of their faith?" His view is that, without an objective definition, it is easier for nations to rationalize not reacting when it occurs.

== Publications ==
- "Klaus Barbie and the United States Government: A Report to the Attorney General" (1983)
- Quiet Neighbors: Prosecuting Nazi War Criminals In America (1984)
- "Nuremberg's Contributions to International Law" (2007)
- Yamashita's Ghost: War Crimes, MacArthur's Justice, and Command Accountability (2012)
- The 9/11 Terror Cases: Constitutional Challenges in the War against Al Qaeda (2015)
- Amos Akerman: Grant's Attorney General Who Broke the Back of the Ku Klux Klan (2021)

== Conferences ==
Professor Ryan has moderated, made presentations, and submitted articles for numerous conferences related to the law of war, war crimes, genocide, and justice.

- Panelist and commentator for "United States Responses to World War Two War Criminals and Human Rights Violators: National and Comparative Perspectives" (1988)
- Moderator for "Panel Discussion: Holocaust and Human Rights Law: The Fourth International Conference" (1992)
- Hilberg Lecture, University of Vermont Center for Holocaust Studies, "Investigating and Prosecuting Nazi War Criminals," (1997)
- Symposium on Sharpening the Cutting Edge of International Human Rights Law: Unresolved Issues of War Crimes Tribunals (2007)

== See also ==
- List of law clerks for the sixth seat of the Supreme Court of the United States
