= Johann Breyer =

German wachmann in Auschwitz concentration camp

- Born: May 30, 1925; Neuwalldorf, Czechoslovakia
- Died: July 22, 2014 (aged 89) Philadelphia, Pennsylvania, U.S.
- Allegiance: Nazi Germany
- Branch: Waffen-SS
- Service years: 1942–1945
- Conflicts: World War II (POW)

Johann Breyer (May 30, 1925 – July 22, 2014) was a Czech-American tool and die maker and onetime SS-Totenkopfverbände concentration and death camp guard whom the United States Department of Justice Office of Special Investigations (OSI) unsuccessfully attempted to denaturalize and deport for his teenage service in the SS. His was considered the "most arcane and convoluted litigation in OSI history", owing to the convergence of three unusual legal factors in the case:

- the question of whether the inability of American mothers to transmit citizenship to children born outside the U.S. before 1934 was unconstitutional,
- if so, then whether Breyer should be retroactively a U.S. citizen at birth and whether that citizenship was lost by volunteering to participate in SS activities,
  - and if so, then whether those activities or a later misrepresentation of his wartime activities to evade U.S. immigration law and enter the U.S. allowed for loss of his later-acquired citizenship, and
- his lawsuits against the media over coverage of the case.

In a series of rulings, federal district courts and the United States Court of Appeals for the Third Circuit overall held that Breyer should have been born a U.S. citizen, and that while he had volunteered for SS activity in support of a totalitarian regime and its actions while age 17, there was insufficient evidence of the voluntariness of his activities after reaching age 18 to result in renunciation of that citizenship.

In 2013, Germany issued an arrest warrant accusing him of aiding in killing 216,000 Jews as a guard at Auschwitz. He was arrested at his home in Philadelphia on June 17, 2014, age 89, and held without bail pending an extradition hearing. His health rapidly deteriorated while in custody, and he died on July 22, prior to his hearing.

== Background ==
Breyer was born in 1925 in the ethnic German farming village of Neuwalldorf, Czechoslovakia (now Nová Lesná, Slovakia), to farmer Johann Breyer and his wife Katrina. Katrina Breyer was purported to have been born in 1895 in Manayunk, Philadelphia and to have moved with her family to Neuwalldorf while a teenager. (While there was no official record of her birth there and there was conflicting secondary evidence as to the place of her birth, a district court eventually ruled her to have been born in the United States. This issue of her birth in the U.S., and the failure of the Department of Justice to timely investigate and raise the issue of whether it was later lost or automatically renounced before giving birth to Johann Breyer would play a pivotal role in the efforts to deport him.) Johann Breyer attended German school and worked on his parents’ farm.

In 1942, at age 17, Breyer volunteered to enlist in the Waffen SS, and was then placed with the SS's Death's Head Battalion (the SS-Totenkopfverbände), composed of volunteers from the overall SS. He was assigned as a guard at Buchenwald and Auschwitz. He acknowledged serving as an armed guard and escorting prisoners to their work sites and denied any personal role in or witnessing of any atrocities. Soviet troops began to approach Auschwitz in January 1945; Breyer was on home leave at the time and was re-routed to a forward fighting unit until taken prisoner by the Soviet Army in May 1945.

He emigrated to the United States in 1952 under the Displaced Persons Act (DPA). The DPA, in its form at that time, specifically excluded from admission to the United States "any person . . . who is or has been a member of or participated in any movement which is or has been hostile to the United States or the form of government of the United States, or to any person who advocated or assisted in the persecution of any person because of race, religion, or national origin." This would later lead the government to allege the Breyer had engaged in willful misrepresentation or deliberate concealment of his particular World War II activities when he immigrated, in violation of federal law.

Breyer settled in Philadelphia where he raised three children with his wife and worked as a tool and die maker for an engineering company. He became a naturalized U.S. citizen in 1957.

== OSI prosecution ==
The OSI became aware of Breyer when a routine cross-check of Auschwitz guard records with Immigration and Naturalization Service records showed that he had emigrated to the United States. In 1992, the OSI filed a denaturalization action with the United States District Court for the Eastern District of Pennsylvania alleging that Breyer was ineligible to enter the U.S. through the DPA since he had assisted in wartime persecution and been part of a movement hostile to the U.S., which he had concealed from the U.S. government in violation of federal law.

Breyer asserted that he should be deemed to have entered the country lawfully as his mother had been born in the U.S. and that the laws in place at the time that granted derivative citizenship only patrilineally were in violation of the Equal Protection Clause of the 14th Amendment. He therefore had to file an application for derivative citizenship with the INS. The cases then proceeded on parallel tracks (the OSI's efforts at denaturalization and Breyer's claim of derivative citizenship) for many years.

In the OSI litigation, the district court held that Breyer was ineligible to enter under the DPA but that the statute denying Breyer citizenship at birth was unconstitutional. At that time, the INS had yet to rule on Breyer's application for derivative citizenship so the court deferred to the INS, thus abstaining from deciding whether Breyer was indeed a U.S. citizen at birth.

Meanwhile, the Immigration and Nationality Technical Corrections Act had been introduced in Congress to retroactively provide for United States citizenship at birth for persons born abroad before 1934 to a mother who was a United States citizen and a father who was not. The OSI pressured Congress to place a "singular exception into the statute" to "deny application of the law to anyone who would not have been eligible to enter the United States under the DPA." As explained by Senator Ted Kennedy at the introduction of the amendment, this was designed to "prevent the possible development of an anomalous situation" that would result in "gender-based discrimination": "the conferring of citizenship on an individual", born abroad to a U.S. citizen mother, "whose wartime activities on behalf of the Nazis could be considered by a federal court to have resulted in his or her" loss of U.S. citizenship had he or she instead been "born abroad of a U.S. citizen father." Then-Congressman Charles Schumer noted that the exception would avoid placing into jeopardy "Nazi expatriation cases pending in the United States", for whom "proper prosecution ... depends on the ability to denaturalize and deport them to stand trial overseas for war crimes," although the only case that was to be affected at that moment was the Breyer litigation.

The INS denied Breyer's application based on the new statute and OSI therefore filed a deportation case. Breyer appealed the INS decision in district court on the grounds that the new statute was a bill of attainder in violation of Article I, Section 9 of the United States Constitution and also unconstitutional under the equality clause as those inadmissible under the DPA were denied citizenship only if it was derived maternally. The district court ruled against Breyer. He also lost his deportation case in immigration court. He appealed both losses to the United States Court of Appeals for the Third Circuit.

The Third Circuit held that the new statute was "arbitrary and irrational" and that he was entitled to derivative citizenship at birth; however, its also held that "a voluntary oath of allegiance to a nation at war with the United States and to an organization of that warring nation that is committed to policies incompatible with the principles of American democracy and the rights of citizens protected by the American constitution -- an organization such as the Death's Head Battalion -- is an unequivocal renunciation of American citizenship whether or not the putative citizen is then aware that he has a right to American citizenship."

The court noted that Breyer voluntarily joined both the Waffen SS, which was a voluntary organization, and then the Death's Head Battalion, which was composed of volunteers from other SS units. It also quoted Holocaust scholar Helmut Krausnick's commentary that any person volunteering to join the SS after 1934 (other than perhaps its almost exclusively military arm, the SS-Verfugungstruppe) would have been aware that he was joining an organization where he would carry out orders that were illegal in nature, and would be committing culpable actions effectively furthering a totalitarian ideology at odds with ethical and lawful behavior and free democratic society.

The OSI then brought suit in district court alleging that Breyer's service in the SS was in itself an expatriating act (i.e., an act that would cause him to lose his citizenship). Under U.S. law in 1942, loyalty oaths and military service with foreign powers were not expatriating if the individual was a minor, as held by the district court. However, the question remained as to whether he had committed any acts after his 18th birthday that were expatriating. "Breyer testified that he had done everything possible to be excused from service," he refused the SS blood group tattoo, he deserted in August 1944 and returned "only because he feared he might be killed if he failed to do so." The district court held that Breyer's service after his 18th birthday was involuntary and not expatriating. The court also declined to hear evidence on whether Breyer's mother had lost U.S. citizenship due to her acquisition of Czechoslovak citizenship, and potentially for taking other actions that could have resulted in renunciation, due to the late stage of the litigation.

The OSI appealed but the Third Circuit affirmed the district court's ruling noting "deserting his unit under what he believed to be penalty of execution suggests that Breyer's service was not voluntary."

== Extradition request from Germany and death ==
On June 17, 2013, the District Court of Weiden, Germany issued an arrest warrant for Breyer for being an accessory to murder while a guard at Auschwitz. He was arrested at his home in Philadelphia on June 17, 2014. Although Breyer was 89 and was in poor health, he was held without bail pending an extradition hearing. On July 19, 2014, Breyer was granted bail and transferred to Thomas Jefferson University Hospital, on the grounds of his worsening health. He died there three days later, just hours before his extradition to Germany was approved.

== See also ==
- John Demjanjuk
