= Jakob Denzinger =

Holocaust concentration camp guard

- Born: Jakob Frank Denzinger; June 29, 1924; Osijek, Kingdom of Yugoslavia
- Died: February 11, 2016 (aged 91); Osijek, Croatia
- Known for: Former Schutzstaffel member; concentration camp guard during the Holocaust

Jakob Frank Denzinger (June 29, 1924 – February 11, 2016) was a Croatian-American concentration camp guard during the Holocaust. He served at five separate concentration camps across three countries as a member of the SS-Totenkopfverbände, including a lengthy stint as a guard at Auschwitz-Birkenau. In 1956, Denzinger emigrated to the United States, becoming a naturalized citizen in 1972. Following an investigation by the US Justice Department, Denzinger fled the US in 1989 in advance of his denaturalization. An Associated Press investigation reported in October 2014 that despite being denaturalized, Denzinger was still receiving monthly Social Security payments through an immigration loophole. In response to the report, the legislature passed a law closing the loophole. President Barack Obama signed the bill in December 2014.

== Early life ==
Jakob Frank Denzinger was born in Osijek, Croatia, then in the Kingdom of Yugoslavia, and was of ethnic German descent. He had at least one brother, named Andrija Denzinger, who is married to Julia Denzinger. In 1950, Jakob married Maria ("Mary"), who was born in Cepin, Croatia on January 17, 1927.

== Nazi era ==
During World War II Denzinger served as a guard at five separate concentration and extermination-death camps: The extermination-death camps at Auschwitz and Mauthausen; and concentration camps Plaszow, Sachsenhausen and Buchenwald. At the age of 18 in 1942, Denzinger began serving in the Schutzstaffel. Starting the next year, he served in the Auschwitz extermination-death camp from May 1943 to March 1945. On April 24, 1945, Denzinger was taken prisoner by Allied forces in France. He was presumably held until the end of the war, 2 September 1945.

== Life in America ==
Denzinger obtained an entry visa into the United States at the American Embassy in Frankfurt. In October 1956, he entered the US and became naturalized in 1972. He settled in Akron, Ohio. Working as a plastics executive, Denzinger "had acquired the trappings of success: a Cadillac DeVille and a Lincoln Town Car, a lakefront home, investments in oil and real estate."

Having learned that American authorities had started the denaturalization process against him, Denzinger left for West Germany in August 1989 after packing "a pair of suitcases". In November 1989, just three months after Denzinger had left the country, his U.S. citizenship was revoked.

== Later life ==
After arriving in West Germany, Denzinger soon moved to his native Osijek, Croatia, where as of 2014 he lived "in a spacious apartment". In October 2014, the U.S. Justice Department's Office of Special Investigations came under scrutiny of Congress and the press when reports in the press revealed that Denzinger and others were collecting American Social Security benefits while living abroad. Denzinger was one of these men, collecting $1500 a month, about twice the average take home pay of Croatian workers. In response to the report, the legislature passed a law closing the loophole. President Barack Obama signed the bill in December 2014.

In 2014 the Croatian government opened a war crimes investigation into Denzinger. He was wanted in Germany, and his name was on a list of people to be prosecuted specifically for Nazi war crimes. Croatian officials have requested documents from the German government, the United States, and the Simon Wiesenthal Centre to support their investigation.

Denzinger's son Thomas stated, "He's made a new life for himself over there [in Croatia]. But he's angry. He claims he was drafted into the army and he did as he was told. You do as you are told or they line you up against a wall and shoot you. You don’t have any choice".

In Čepin, Croatia, a grave was prepared for Denzinger before his death. The grave has a tombstone on black marble along with gold-colored inscriptions. A portrait photo of Denzinger is included on the tombstone, protected from the elements by a clear plastic coating. Denzinger's wife Maria died on April 26, 2014, in the United States after being diagnosed with lung cancer three days before. Denzinger died in Croatia on February 11, 2016.

== See also ==
- List of fugitives from justice who disappeared
