= Mike Pasker =

Lithuanian mass murderer

Mike Pasker (born Mečys Paškevičius; September 26, 1901 – October 1, 1993) was a Lithuanian police officer who later immigrated to the United States and worked as an electrician.

Born in Ukmergė, Lithuania, Paškevičius was a sergeant of the Lithuanian Security Police from 1941 to 1944, while Lithuania was under Nazi occupation. According to later eyewitness testimony, Paškevičius marched 100 Lithuanian Jews and killed them by shooting and/or hanging them in the Ukmergė forest in July 1941, and assisted in the murder of 12,000 other Jews during his time of service. Paškevičius fled to Germany in 1944. He moved to the United States in 1950 and settled in Chicago, Illinois. After moving to the United States, Paškevičius divorced his first wife, Ona, and remarried, to Hildegard Gertrud Kaese (1925–1980), whom he originally met in Germany. During his time in Chicago, Paškevičius worked as an electrician, and he changed his name to Mike Pasker upon his naturalization as a United States citizen in 1962. Pasker and his wife retired to Santa Monica, California in 1972.

Pasker's Nazi past was first mentioned in a Lithuanian-language newspaper in Cleveland 1959. He was then mentioned by TASS in a 1960s radio broadcast, which resulted in an article in the Chicago Tribune. Based on these allegations, along with eyewitness testimony, the federal government filed suit in 1977 to revoke Pasker's citizenship, and he consented to denaturalization in 1979 after admitting to concealing his past as a Lithuanian police officer during his immigration. While living in Santa Monica, Pasker was the target of several assassination attempts by Jewish militant groups. In 1978, members of the Jewish Defense League picketed his condominium, and a gunman shot into his apartment on June 6. On December 6, 1979, his condominium was damaged by a car bomb. Pasker then moved to a different home in Santa Monica, before moving to St. Petersburg Beach, Florida, where his wife died on June 20, 1980.

== Last years and death ==
The Immigration and Naturalization Service initially served Pasker with a deportation hearing in Los Angeles in 1980, but Pasker had already left California by that time. After authorities tracked him down to Florida, he was served with another deportation hearing, this time in Miami. By then, however, his health was failing, having suffered a stroke and heart problems, and a Circuit Court judge declared him legally incompetent in late 1980. As a result, Pasker's deportation was never seriously pursued after that. Pasker succumbed, five days after his 92nd birthday, to cancer, Alzheimer's disease, and other ailments in 1993 in Florida.
