= John Hansl =

John Hansl (January 21, 1925 – June 29, 2007) was a former member of the Nazi Waffen-SS, who gained notoriety for the subsequent legal actions in the United States that led to the revocation of his citizenship due to his war-time activities. Born Johann Hansl in Donji Miholjac, Yugoslavia, now part of Croatia, to ethnic German parents, he was stationed as an armed guard in the SS Death's Head battalion at the Sachsenhausen concentration camp near Berlin, and subsequently at the Natzweiler concentration camp in France.

After World War II, Hansl resettled in Austria before emigrating to the United States in 1955, where he was granted citizenship in the 1960s. His past as a Nazi concentration camp guard led to the revocation of his American citizenship in 2005, following an investigation by the Office of Special Investigations. On April 8, 2005, a federal court ruled that "regarding his personal conduct as a Death's Head guard leaves no room for factual dispute whether he personally advocated or assisted in persecution". This decision was later affirmed by the U.S. Court of Appeals for the Eighth Circuit, with the U.S. Supreme Court declining to review the case.

== Death ==
Hansl died in a nursing home in Des Moines, Iowa, aged 82.
