= Martin Bartesch =

Nazi concentration camp guard

Martin Bartesch (October 16, 1926 – December 1989) was a Romanian-born member of the Prinz Eugen Division of the SS. From 1943 to 1944, he served as a guard at Mauthausen concentration camp. On October 23, 1943, he shot and killed Gottfried Ochshorn when Ochshorn attempted to escape.

Bartesch emigrated to the United States in 1955 and was granted citizenship in 1966. In May 1987, the U.S. Office of Special Investigations found a record stating that Bartesch had killed a prisoner while serving as a guard, which he had not mentioned on his immigration forms. Bartesch, then 61 years old and employed as a janitor in Chicago, was stripped of his U.S. citizenship and deported to Austria, on the grounds that he had lied by failing to disclose this information.

Austrian government officials allegedly received minimal notice that Bartesch was being deported, and claimed that the U.S had violated international law in doing so. Austrian authorities reportedly declared Bartesch "undesirable" and demanded that the United States take him back. When the U.S. Justice Department stated that Bartesch would not be allowed to return, Austrian Interior Minister Karl Blecha issued a warrant for Bartesch's arrest.

Bartesch was arrested on June 3, 1987, but was released three days later. He was released after the U.S. refused to accept him. The murder charge against Bartesch was dropped after it was found that the 20-year statute of limitations had expired. Under Austrian law, murder normally has no statute of limitations, but the case was an exception since Bartesch was a juvenile when the crime was committed.
