= Fawaz Damrah =

Fawaz Mohammed Damrah (Arabic: فواز ضمرة, Fawwāz Damra) was the imam of the Islamic Center of Parma, the largest mosque in the Cleveland area and taught at Cleveland State University and the local community college. Damra was born in the West Bank city of Nablus in 1961. He studied law in Jordan. He arrived in the United States in the mid-1980s and was an active religious figure in the Muslim American community. In January 2004 Damra was arrested by federal officials on an immigration violation and he was ultimately denaturalized and deported back to the West Bank. He has three daughters who were all born in the United States.

== Background ==
Before moving to Ohio, Damra had also served as an imam at the al-Farooq mosque in Brooklyn, New York between 1986 and 1990. During the 1990s he was praised for outreach efforts in Jewish and Christian communities. He continued these interfaith efforts after the September 11 attacks.

In late September 2001, after the attacks, a Cleveland TV station showed a video of a speech Damra had made in 1991 where he recommended stabbing Jews in Israel. Before the video aired he was well-regarded as a moderate Muslim. Damra has said that at the time of the speech Palestinian Islamic Jihad was not a designated Foreign Terrorist Organization (FTO) and explained that his rhetoric was influenced by his experiences growing up in the Israeli-occupied West Bank. He apologized publicly for the remarks. He said that his outreach efforts with Jewish and Christian communities over the years had helped shape his views about peace and tolerance, saying "As all of us go through evolution in our life, intellectual and spiritual, so did I".

== Denaturalization ==
He was indicted in 2004, and prosecutors argued that Damra had lied on his U.S. citizenship application. He was charged with fundraising to support international terrorism and affiliation with groups persecuting Jews. Damrah told PBS he "never raised money for any organization listed in the United States supporting terrorism". This was found patently false. Imam Damrah was convicted of concealing ties to three groups; Afghan Refugee Services (ARS); the Islamic Committee for Palestine (ICP); and Palestinian Islamic Jihad (PIJ). Consequently, his American citizenship was revoked by United States District Judge James S. Gwin.

A video made by Steven Emerson was aired on PBS. Due to statements made on the video, it became clear all groups the United States government classifies as jihadist terrorist organizations, were being funded and abetted by Fawaz Damrah's mid-west operations from his Cleveland mega-mosque, and through the North American upstreaming network of the Muslim Brotherhood, the 'Ummah', to HAMAS, Hezbollah and other jihadist terror entities in Palestine and the Mid-East. These activities demonstrated Fawaz Damrah was guilty of lying on his citizenship application, denying any connection to jihadi terror. His United States citizenship was revoked and he was deported to the Palestinian West Bank in January 2007.

== Deportation ==
The Bureau of Immigration and Customs Enforcement reported that Damrah was delivered to Israeli security agents at a West Bank crossing controlled by Israel. On January 26, 2007, The Plain Dealer (Cleveland, Ohio) reported that Damrah had been released from an Israeli prison after three weeks in custody and returned to the West Bank where he was staying with family.
