= Walus denaturalization case =

American wrongly accused of war crimes (1922–1994)

Frank Walus (July 29, 1922 – August 17, 1994) was born in Germany of Polish parents and emigrated to the United States in 1963. He worked in a factory in the Chicago area and became a U.S. citizen in 1970. In 1973, he was accused of having been a Nazi who beat and killed Jews in Poland during World War II. Prosecution was initiated by the US Immigration and Naturalization Service (INS) in 1977. He was convicted based upon questionable testimony in a bench trial before a judge who appeared visibly hostile to the defense. An appeals court vacated the verdict and ordered a new trial before a different judge. By this time, the new Office of Special Investigations (OSI) had been established in the US Department of Justice. After conducting a lengthy and exhaustive investigation of witnesses and documents, OSI concluded that it "could not responsibly go forward with a new trial." OSI dropped the charges, expressed regret that they had ever been filed, and partially reimbursed Walus for his expenses. In February 1981, a federal judge awarded Walus $31,000 in compensation, albeit Walus said he had lost $120,000.

== Background ==
Immediately after World War II, Americans chose not to dwell upon the war's atrocities, and Cold War threats caused Western governments to recruit former Nazis for intelligence work. This, along with U.S. immigration policies, made it relatively easy for former Nazis to enter the United States and become citizens. In the 1970s, growing awareness and concern about these "quiet neighbors" resulted in the establishment of US government organizations to identify, denaturalize, and deport them. The early work by the Special Litigation Unit (SLU) of the INS was regarded as ineffective and, according to legal scholar Lawrence Douglas, led "botched litigations." One of these was the Walus case.

Walus expelled a boarder, Michael Alper, from his home in 1973 after a bitter argument. A year later, Alper told a Chicago Jewish agency that Walus had bragged about his work as a Nazi in Poland. The allegation ultimately reached Simon Wiesenthal, a well known Nazi hunter, who brought the matter to the attention of the INS. Alper was Jewish and his parents had been killed by the Nazis. Nonetheless he and his wife had continued to live with Walus even after Walus' alleged disclosure about persecuting Jews.

By 1976, the INS was under pressure to address public outcries about former Nazis in America. INS sent a grainy, washed-out 1959 photograph of Walus to the police in Israel requesting information. The police put an advertisement including Walus' name in local newspapers requesting any information Polish survivors might have. Some who came forward and viewed the photo said they recognized Walus as a Gestapo officer who had killed Jews in the Polish cities of Kielce and Częstochowa. In 1977, the US Attorney in Chicago filed suit to revoke Walus' citizenship on the basis that Walus had been a Gestapo officer who committed wartime atrocities and had lied in order to gain entry into the US. Once denaturalized, Walus could be deported.

== Trial ==
Denaturalization was a civil, not criminal matter and Walus was not entitled to a jury trial. Evidence was heard by the eighty-three year old Jewish judge Julius Hoffman who had a history of injecting himself into cases before him. He interfered with defense attorney Robert Korenkiewicz's questioning of witnesses and declared that "the defendant did commit war atrocities" even before Korenkiewicz had begun presenting Walus' defense.

The INS prosecution was almost entirely built upon witnesses who claimed to have seen Walus in Poland committing atrocities. No documents were presented to support that Walus was in Poland during the war or that he was ever a Gestapo officer.

Walus asserted that he was not in Poland during the war, but was one of the millions of Poles sent to Germany to provide forced farm labor. There was documentary evidence from German archives that farmers had paid for Walus' health insurance there and that his forced service in Germany was continuous starting in 1940. He had worked on four or five farms, and the wives of the farmers where he had worked remembered his being there. Further, as a Pole he could not have been a member of the Gestapo, which restricted its number to members of the "master race" and to people taller than Walus' 5'4" height.

The trial lasted seventeen days. Two mutually exclusive possibilities had been presented. Either Walus had been a Gestapo officer in Poland or a forced farm laborer in Germany. Hoffman decided upon the former, relying upon the eyewitness testimony from the persecuted Poles as well as the claims by former boarder Alper. Hoffman disregarded eyewitness testimony from defense eyewitnesses as well as the defense's documentary evidence. He issued his ruling in 1978 that Walus' citizenship be revoked. Shortly thereafter, the defense located five Polish forced laborers who would testify that Walus was with them in Germany during the war. Some old German residency papers proving Walus was in Germany in 1940 were also located. With this additional evidence, Walus' defense attorneys asked Hoffman for a new trial. He refused.

== Appeal ==
The Seventh Circuit Court of Appeals heard oral argument from Walus' attorneys in 1979. It vacated Hoffman's verdict and ordered that there be a new trial, this time with a different judge. Their ruling noted Hoffman's "disturbing" behavior, especially his cutting off defense efforts to cross-examine witnesses. It also noted the weaknesses of the prosecution's case and observed that the newly found evidence would "almost certainly compel a different result."

== Further investigation ==
The case now came to the newly formed Office of Special Investigations of the Justice Department. Because of obvious weaknesses in the case for prosecution, OSI's new director, Allan Ryan, called for an exhaustive investigation of the evidence. It lasted nine months. OSI investigators traveled to Germany, Poland, and Israel to interview witnesses and search for documents. Efforts were made to locate Kielce and Częstochowa survivors in the US as well as overseas. A document analyst was retained in Germany. An OSI historian searched the US National Archives for records. The investigators concluded that witness testimony at the previous trial was of questionable reliability and that there was conflicting evidence about where Walus had been during the war. In light of the uncertainty, the OSI concluded that there was a strong possibility of mistaken identity and that it "could not responsibly go forward with a retrial." One of the two principal OSI investigators had even come to the conclusion that Walus was innocent.

Not going forward to retry the case had some potentially negative consequences for OSI. Simon Wiesenthal had an interest in the case. The Israeli police had cooperated in providing evidence. Several Holocaust survivors had traveled to America from Israel and came to court to emotionally confront Walus, whom they believed to be their former tormentor. OSI had not yet won the confidence of the Jewish community, whose support could be important for the organization's success in prosecuting other cases. This was especially true since the bulk of the evidence regarding Nazi wartime atrocities lay behind the Iron Curtain, and OSI was getting little cooperation from officials in Moscow and Washington. This situation threatened the viability of OSI's mission.

== Decision and aftermath ==
OSI declined to retry Walus. The question then arose whether the government should express regret or even issue an apology to Walus. There was internal disagreement on this, and it was finally agreed that an expression of regret was appropriate. OSI reimbursement of attorney's fees was generally prohibited by law, but Walus was awarded $34,000 to offset other costs he incurred.

From its founding, OSI had been the object of criticism from various groups. It was clear from early on that achieving OSI's goals was going to have to involve a lot of public relations work as well as research and prosecution. Eastern European nationality groups were concerned about OSI's mission since it could be expected to target some from their community. They opposed OSI's use of evidence from the USSR since it had an interest in discrediting Baltic State, Ukrainian, and other emigre groups and might well provide false information and forged documents to achieve their aims. These emigre groups also challenged the use of the lower standard of evidence involved in civil trials compared to criminal trials, even though citizenship revocation and deportation were civil issues and US law at the time did not provide for criminal penalties for crimes committed on foreign soil unless against US citizens. The emigres also feared that OSI might seek to deport anyone who had lied on their entry applications, not just the wartime persecutors that OSI sought to expel. In contrast, Jewish groups were pressing for more determined action by OSI than INS had demonstrated. These various groups viewed the original decision by INS to prosecute Walus, and then the decision by OSI not to retry him, as evidence to amplify their separate concerns about the work of the OSI. The press castigated the government for its original prosecution of Walus. On the other side, Lieut. Col. Menachem Russek of the Israeli national police, Israel's chief investigator of Nazi war crimes, sharply criticized the Department of Justice for not retrying the case. Nonetheless, he said the Israeli police would continue to cooperate with OSI in their efforts to find and deport former Nazis who committed wartime atrocities.

As a result of the Walus case, concerns about mistaken identity led OSI to place greater emphasis upon documentary evidence to support eyewitness testimony in future prosecutions. Greater care was also taken in presenting photographic evidence to potential witnesses.

The personal cost of the litigation to Walus was high. In addition to assaults and receiving death threats, he paid over $60,000 for his defense. He sold his house to pay for his attorneys and subsequently lived with his wife at the home of one of their children.

== Personal life ==
Walus was born on July 29, 1922, to Polish parents residing in Germany. His father died in 1932, and his mother moved to the Kielce area in Poland. He was 17 when Poland was invaded by Germany in 1939, and he was forced to go to Germany to work on farms in the area around Neu-Ulm. After the war, he returned to Kielce for ten years, after which he and his wife emigrated to the United States. He worked in an automobile factory and bought a duplex in Chicago's southwest side. Walus died of a heart attack in Chicago on August 17, 1994. He had four children.

== Citations ==
=== Principal sources ===
- Feigin, Judy, "The Office of Special Investigations: Striving for Accountability in the Aftermath of the Holocaust", U.S. Department of Justice, 2006.
- Johnson, Flora, "The Nazi Who Never Was", The Washington Post, 22 March 2021
- Douglas, Lawrence, The Right Wrong Man- John Demjanjuk and the Last Great Nazi War Crimes Trial, Princeton University Press, 2016.
- Ryan, Allan A., Jr,, Quiet Neighbors- Prosecuting Nazi War Criminals In America, Harcourt Brace Jovanovich, 1984.
