= Office of Special Investigations (United States Department of Justice) =

Government agency (U.S Justice Department)

The Office of Special Investigations (OSI) of the U.S. Justice Department was created in 1979 to identify and expel, from the United States, those who assisted Nazis in persecuting "any person because of race, religion, national origin, or political opinion." This involved gathering, verifying, and presenting in court eyewitness and documentary evidence of decades-old crimes. The evidence was incomplete and scattered around the world. Much of it was then in Eastern Europe, behind the Iron Curtain. Nonetheless, the OSI investigated 1,700 persons suspected of being involved in Nazi war crimes. Over 300 have been prosecuted with at least 100 stripped of their U.S. citizenship and 70 deported, the most recent in 2021. Others have left voluntarily, fled, or have been blocked from entering the United States. In the 1980s, at least seven men facing investigation or prosecution from the OSI committed suicide.

Immediately after World War II, Americans chose not to dwell upon the war's atrocities, and Cold War threats caused governments to recruit former Nazis for intelligence work. Newly formulated U.S. immigration policies and prejudice created obstacles for entering the United States by people displaced by the war. As a result, it became easier for former Nazis and their collaborators to enter the U.S. than for Holocaust survivors. Sometimes protected by U.S. Intelligence officials, war criminals found a safe haven in America. OSI was founded to ferret them out. It operated as a separate unit until 2010 when it was merged with the Domestic Security Section of the Justice Department Criminal Division to form a new unit, the Human Rights and Special Prosecutions Section (HRSP). According to The Washington Post, the United States has successfully prosecuted more Nazis than all other countries combined and is "widely deemed to have the world's most aggressive and effective Nazi-hunting operation." While efforts continue to prosecute those involved in atrocities during World War II, the principal focus of HRSP's human rights enforcement work is now on prosecuting war criminals from postwar conflicts including those in Bosnia, Serbia, Rwanda, and Guatemala.

A thorough history of OSI was produced by legal historian Judith Feigin of the Justice department in 2006. It concluded that, in addition to having obtained some measure of justice for wartime atrocities, OSI set international standards for prosecuting perpetrators of genocide and made substantial contributions to the historical record that "stand as a permanent and irrefutable response to those who would deny the Holocaust and its horrors." Further, "the message resonating from OSI's cases is that the United States does not choose to add to its populace persons whose actions victimized innocent civilians."

== Founding of OSI ==
=== Braunsteiner-Ryan case ===
In 1964, it was discovered that Hermine Braunsteiner, a former SS guard in the concentration camps Ravensbrück and Majdanek, was living in the United States. She had met Russel Ryan while he was on holiday in Austria, and she entered the United States in 1959 shortly after their marriage. The case caused an outcry and, as a result, the Special Litigation Unit was set up at the immigration authority. This group was to identify other war criminals from the Nazi-era who lived in the United States. The unit was transferred from INS to the Justice Department in September 1979.

=== Initiative by Congresswoman Elizabeth Holtzman ===
New York Congresswoman Elizabeth Holtzman called for and actively promoted strengthening the special unit to prosecute war criminals residing in the United States. The Office of Special Investigations (OSI) was established in 1979 within the US Department of Justice. Its task consisted of processing the accumulated cases and the resumption of the search for war criminals in the United States. The OSI was equipped with broad powers that enabled it to take all necessary steps to accomplish its mission including investigation, litigation, negotiating with foreign governments, and calling for support from other U.S. authorities.

== Early leadership ==
As an assistant to the US solicitor general, Allan Ryan had been arguing cases before the Supreme Court on behalf of the government. By chance, he was assigned a case already lost by the Immigration and Naturalization Service (INS) to strip Feodor Fedorenko, of his US citizenship and deport him to the Soviet Union. Fedorenko was alleged to have been a guard at a Jewish ghetto and at Treblinka extermination camp, where a total of 800,000 Jews had been murdered by the Nazis. Ryan considered himself a prosecutor rather than a Nazi-hunter, but he came to believe the case was important and recommended that it be pursued. He won the case in the court of appeals, and the Supreme Court later upheld the appeals court's ruling. That case, Fedorenko v. United States, became OSI's seminal case that set important legal precedent and led to Ryan's being asked to serve as the second Director of OSI, following the brief tenure of Walter Rockler. In 1984, Fedorenko was deported to the Soviet Union after being denaturalized. There, he was arrested and put on trial for treason, war crimes, and collaborationism for working in Treblinka extermination camp. Fedorenko was found guilty, sentenced to death, and executed in 1987.

== Early challenges ==
Ryan led the organization during its formative years, from 1980 to 1983, navigating a difficult political landscape. He established the importance of historical research in addition to criminal investigation and won precedent-setting cases. OSI's approach was to identify those who met the criteria for being Nazi war criminals, determine whether they had lied about their wartime activities when applying for entry into the U.S or for U.S. citizenship and, if so, strip them of their citizenship and deport them. Initial leads came passively from existing INS cases, Jewish organizations also searching for war criminals, and individuals who by chance come across their former tormentors. OSI emphasis on historical research soon enabled the organization to become proactive in developing leads and it ultimately becoming a resource for Holocaust and other World War II research well beyond OSI's mandate to prosecute.

=== Disagreements over OSI operations ===
As the work began, OSI faced widespread disagreement on many important issues. Some felt the effort to expel World War II war criminals was important both to achieve justice and to set precedent for the future, while others felt that the time had passed for pursuit of these aims. Some Justice Department officials felt OSI should have a Jewish Director, while others did not want the office to be viewed as a Jewish organization and favored Ryan as director in part because he was not Jewish. Eastern European nationality groups opposed OSI's use of evidence from the USSR, which had an interest in discrediting Baltic State, Ukrainian, and other emigre groups and might well provide false information and forged documents to achieve their aims. These emigre groups also challenged the use of the lower standard of evidence involved in civil trials compared to criminal trials, even though citizenship revocation and deportation were civil issues and US law at the time did not provide for criminal penalties for crimes committed on foreign soil unless against US citizens. The emigres also feared that OSI might seek to deport anyone who had lied on their entry applications, not just the wartime persecutors that OSI sought to expel. In contrast, Jewish groups were pressing for more determined action by OSI than INS had demonstrated. It became clear that leading OSI was going to involve a lot of public relations work as well as research and prosecution.

=== Disagreements over who should be prosecuted ===
From the beginning, OSI had to deal with disagreements over who should be prosecuted. In contrast to the Fedorenko case, which the INS had lost and OSI had won on appeal, the Walus case had been lost on appeal by the U.S. Attorney's Office in Chicago with the court ordering a retrial. Director Ryan counseled against pursuing the case. The documentary evidence was weak and the eyewitnesses, forty years after the fact, were unconvincing. It was even possible that this was a case of mistaken identity. According to Judith Feigin, OSI's historian, it took courage in 1981 for OSI to dismiss the Walus case. Frank Walus had come to the attention of INS in 1974 by a letter from Simon Wiesenthal, a highly respected Holocaust survivor and acclaimed Nazi hunter. Several Holocaust survivors had traveled to America from Israel and emotionally confronted Walus, whom they believed to be their former tormentor, in court. Furthermore, OSI had not yet won the confidence of the Jewish community, whose support could be important for the organization's success. OSI could expect a negative reaction for not pursuing Walus.

== Representative cases prosecuted ==
By the middle of 1984, forty cases had been filed by OSI against war criminals then living in America. Through the next few years, OSI successfully prosecuted over 130 other cases involving persons complicit in Nazi war crimes and subsequently living quietly in America. Many of these cases are discussed in detail in the OSI history produced in 2006. Three such cases in which OSI sought expulsion reached the Supreme Court.

Most cases involved relatively low level camp guards who had beaten or executed prisoners or had led them to places of execution. Juozas Kungys, for example, was prosecuted because OSI determined he had "rounded up and transported thousands of Jews to an execution site, distributed firearms and ammunition to an execution squad, forced the victims into a mass grave, shot some of them, and exhorted the execution squad to do the same. Other cases involved high-ranking officials and prominent Nazi collaborators.

In many cases, the individual charged left the U.S. voluntarily rather than face deportation proceedings. In many other cases, naturalized individuals agreed to give up U.S. citizenship but were allowed to remain in the U.S due to ill health rather than be deported. In some cases deportation was complicated by there being no country willing to accept the deportee.

Not every case was brought to a satisfactory conclusion. Case law evolved over time with various court rulings regarding legally complex matters of interpretation of statutes and sufficiency of evidence. Sometimes compromises were required. In the case of Kungys, an agreement was reached for him to give up his citizenship but not be deported. Due to the delayed pursuit of justice, many subjects of OSI prosecution died before their cases could be taken to completion in the U.S. or in other countries.

Some representative cases are included below. The dates in parentheses indicate the period during which INS, OSI, or HRSP were pursuing legal action against the individual.

=== Andrija Artuković (1951–1986) ===
Andrija Artuković was a construction worker in California. During the war, he had been a senior official in occupied Croatia. His decrees called for internment and execution of "undesirables" such as Serbs, Jews, Gypsies, Orthodox Christians, and Communists. Hundreds of thousands of Serbs and Jews were massacred as a result. He was extradited to Yugoslavia in 1986, tried, convicted, and sentenced to death by firing squad. Due to his poor health, execution was deferred, and he died of natural causes in 1988 in a prison hospital. The litigation over this high ranking Nazi collaborator was the longest experienced by INS and OSI.

=== Valerian Trifa (1975–1982) ===
Valerian Trifa, as archbishop of the Romanian Orthodox Episcopate in Grass Lake, Michigan, was a powerful and influential religious figure in the U.S. At one point, he even presented the opening invocation for the U.S. Senate. During the war, he had been a propagandist and member of Romania's fascist Iron Guard. His anti-Semitic writings provoked riots resulting in torture and murder of hundreds of Jews. As OSI was preparing to take him to trial, Trifa surrendered his citizenship and was ultimately deported to Portugal. Portugal later tried to deport him as well, but he died of a heart attack before this could be completed.

=== Wolodymir Osidach (1979–1981) ===
Wolodymir Osidach was a retired slaughterhouse worker in Philadelphia who, during the war, had been an officer in the Ukrainian police force at Rava Raska that helped the Germans round up 14,000 Jews for transportation to the Belzec extermination camp. In November 1979, the OSI filed a complaint that Osidach had lied about his wartime activities when he successfully applied for entry into the United States in 1949 as a Displaced Person. This was the first case handled by the newly created OSI from beginning to end and the first it took to trial. Without determining whether Osidach was responsible for specific atrocities, the judge agreed that Osidach had fraudulently entered the US and subsequently obtained US citizenship. Accordingly, in 1981, the judge stripped Osidach of his naturalized citizenship, opening the way for his deportation. Osidach died of a heart attack before deportation hearings commenced.

=== Otto von Bolschwing (1979–1982) ===
Otto von Bolschwing worked for a computer leasing company in California where he rose to the level of vice president. During the war, he had been the chief SS intelligence officer in Romania. He worked with Adolf Eichmann to devise programs that persecuted Germany's Jews. After the war, he worked for the Central Intelligence Agency before emigrating to America. Rather than contest the OSI complaint against him, Bolschwing agreed to surrender his citizenship. He died before deportation proceedings were initiated. He was the highest ranking German prosecuted by OSI.

=== Karl Linnas (1979–1987) ===
Karl Linnas worked as a land surveyor living in Greenlawn, New York. During the war, he had been head of an Estonian concentration camp during the Nazi occupation. Kneeling prisoners were shot on his orders. The Soviets convicted him in absentia for having taken an active part in 12,000 murders and wanted him extradited. After extensive legal proceedings, Linnas was ultimately sent to the U.S.S.R., where he died in a prison hospital.

=== Johann Breyer (1992–2014) ===
Johann Breyer was a tool and die maker for an engineering company in Philadelphia, Pennsylvania. During the war, he had been a member of the Death's Head Battalion of the Waffen-SS acting as a guard at Buchenwald and Auschwitz, at which he was accused as an accessory in the murder of 216,000 Jews. He came to the U.S. in 1952 and became a naturalized citizen in 1957. Denaturalization proceedings were complicated by his mother's claim that she had been born in the U.S. and that Breyer was only seventeen years old when he began service with the SS. After the "most arcane and convoluted litigation in OSI history," the courts ultimately blocked OSI's efforts to strip Breyer of his U.S. citizenship. No deportation proceedings were then possible. In 2013, however, Germany requested that Breyer be extradited. He was arrested but died at age 89 before an extradition hearing could begin.

=== Juozas Budreika (1994–1996) ===
Juozas Budreika was a retired cook in Gulfport, Florida. During the war he had been a member of the 2nd/12th Lithuanian Schutzmannschaft (Protective Detachment) Battalion, a mobile killing unit that murdered thousands of unarmed Jews and other civilians in Lithuania and Byelorussia. He agreed to forfeit his citizenship and relocate to Lithuania, where he died shortly after his arrival.

=== Algimantas Dailidė (1994–2003) ===
Algimantas Dailidė was a retired Cleveland, Ohio real estate agent living in Gulfport, Florida. During the war, he was a member of the Lithuanian Security Police (the Saugumas) that arrested Jews who attempted to escape from the Vilnius ghetto and turned them over to the Nazis. Such people were generally shot outside Vilnius at the Paneriai execution pits, where about 50,000 Jews were murdered. His U.S. citizenship was revoked in 1997, and he was ordered deported to Lithuania in 2002. In 2006, he was convicted by a Lithuanian court of persecuting civilians but, because of his age, he was not sentenced to prison. He died in Europe in 2015 and was buried in Ohio.

=== Demjanjuk controversy (1975–2009) ===
A highly controversial and widely publicized case involved Ivan (aka John) Demjanjuk, who was ultimately convicted in 2011 in Germany as an accessory in the murder of 28,000 Jews while a guard at Sobibor extermination camp in occupied Poland. This conviction was the culmination of determined prosecutorial efforts over thirty years in three countries. Legal scholar Lawrence Douglas, who wrote a detailed history of the Demjanjuk case, concluded in 2016 that, in spite of serious missteps along the way, the German verdict brought the case "to a worthy and just conclusion" that "never would have happened without the stubborn exertions of the OSI.

The controversy stemmed from OSI's initially mistaking Demjanjuk's identity and proceeding with denaturalization action against him in the belief that he was the notorious, sadistic guard known as "Ivan the Terrible" at Treblinka extermination camp. OSI had obtained conflicting evidence from documents and eyewitnesses as to Demjanjuk's description and location during the war that led one member of the prosecution team to recommend not pursuing the case. Others were convinced at the time that Demjunjuk was "Ivan" and the case went forward. At his U.S. denaturalization trial in 1981, Demjanjuk was judged to be the Treblinka guard "Ivan" and the U.S. citizenship he had obtained in 1958 was revoked. In separate, subsequent proceedings, it was further determined that he was deportable and extraditable. At the request of the government of Israel, he was extradited to face trial there for war crimes. In 1988, after a fourteen-month trial, it was again determined that Demjanjuk was "Ivan the Terrible." He was found guilty of war crimes and sentenced to death.

During the period that Demjanjuk's Israeli conviction was on appeal, the Soviet Union collapsed. New evidence became available in 1991 from behind the former Iron Curtain that strongly indicated that Demjanjuk had not been at Treblinka (and therefore was not "Ivan the Terrible") but had been at other notorious camps, including Trawniki, Sobibor, Flossenburg and Majdanek. Demjanjuk's defense team in the U.S. used this new evidence, along with allegations of improprieties by the OSI, to overturn both the denaturalization decision as well as the later extradition decision. In 1993, the Israeli Supreme court also acquitted Demjanjuk of charges related to the actions of "Ivan the Terrible," even though there was considerable evidence of his being involved with war crimes at other camps. Demjanjuk was freed and, although no longer a U.S. citizen, he was returned to the United States.

In obtaining this favorable result for their client, Demjanjuk's defense teams in the U.S. and Israel accused OSI of improperly withholding evidence that should have been disclosed because it was potentially useful to their client. They further accused OSI of intentionally presenting falsified evidence, and improperly influencing witnesses. OSI denied all these charges.

These accusations prompted seven separate investigations looking for evidence of prosecutorial or ethical misconduct. They were conducted by three separate investigative bodies between 1987 and 1993. First, the Appeals Court appointed a Special Master, Federal District Court Judge Thomas A. Wiseman, Jr., who conducted a six-month inquiry resulting in a 210-page report. Wiseman concluded that OSI prosecutors "did not intend to violate the Rules or their ethical obligations." They had cooperated fully in his investigation, testified truthfully, and were "principled, albeit fallible." Wiseman found no prosecutorial misconduct. Second, the District of Columbia Bar reviewed the conduct of both director Ryan and the attorney assigned to the case. It also found no wrongdoing. Third, the Department of Justice (DOJ) Office of Professional Responsibility (OPR) conducted a total of five internal inquiries into various aspects of the prosecution. One was at the request of OSI itself and another at the request of Demjanjuk's defense team. These investigations also concluded that there had been no improper conduct. Another OPR investigation was made at the request of Sixth Circuit Court of Appeals Judge Gilbert S. Merritt, Jr., who had presided during the Demjanjuk denaturalization hearing and was highly critical of the prosecution, including a charge that "Jewish special interest groups" had influenced Ryan and the OSI. OPR found no merit to these charges. In short, all investigations, internal and external, of OSI's conduct in the prosecution of Demjanjuk concluded that there had been no intentional wrongdoing.

Nonetheless, the Appeals Court concluded that the government had defined too narrowly its duty to disclose potentially useful documents to the defense. Accordingly, in 1998, the Appeals Court rescinded its extradition order. In subsequent actions, based on the determination of the Appeals Court, Demjanjuk's deportation order was nullified and his U.S. citizenship restored. Further, the Court ruled that, because the civil actions regarding denaturalization and deportation were based upon allegations of criminal activity on the part of a defendant, henceforth OSI would have to use the more exacting rules of disclosure required by criminal proceedings. Lawrence Douglas characterized the court's action as "surprising" and particularly remarkable since the court "admonished the OSI for failing to satisfy a standard that the court had only just imposed."

Undeterred, and using the documents that became available since 1991 that had helped Demjanjuk establish he was not Ivan The Terrible, OSI filed a new complaint in 1999 seeking denaturalization, now based upon Demjanjuk's correct identity and his service at Trawniki, Sobibor, Majdanek, and Flossenburg. For a second time, Demjanjuk was stripped of his citizenship. Through multiple appeals and other legal maneuvering, Demjanjuk's defense team successfully delayed his deportation, this time to Germany, until 2009 and delayed conclusion of his trial there until 2011. After 91 days of trial, he was convicted on 16 counts as an accessory to the murder of over 28,000 Jews at Sobibor extermination camp during 1943. Accordingly, he was sentenced to five years in prison.

Again Demjanjuk appealed, but he died before the appeal was heard. His attorneys unsuccessfully appealed to have his citizenship restored posthumously. His relatives successfully arranged for his burial in Ohio, near where he used to live.

The controversy surrounding Demjanjuk's mistaken identity received extensive publicity in the U.S. His ultimate conviction for war crimes decades later in Germany did not. As a result, according to historian Judith Feigin, "many members of the public still know of OSI [only] as the mistaken prosecutor of Ivan the Terrible" and not the successful prosecutor of a Nazi war criminal.

== Report on Klaus Barbie (1983) ==
In 1983, near the end of Allan Ryan's directorship at OSI, he was asked to investigate the relationship between Klaus Barbie and the U.S. government following World War II. As Gestapo chief in Lyon, France, Barbie personally beat and tortured men, women, and children, reportedly laughing as he did so. His methods included whipping, electric shocks, breaking arms and legs, and sexual abuse, earning him the title "Butcher of Lyon." He also deported Jewish children to Auschwitz concentration camp, where they were murdered. Barbie was ultimately found in Bolivia, extradited to France, convicted of crimes against humanity, and sentenced to life imprisonment. The questions about American involvement were, as America's focus shifted from the threat from Nazis to the threat from communism, was Barbie recruited to serve as a U.S. agent in Germany and, when French officials sought to bring Barbie to justice, did the U.S. government help him escape to Bolivia.

Ryan's thoroughly researched report to the Attorney General concluded that "officers of the United States government were directly responsible for protecting a person wanted by the government of France on criminal charges and in arranging his escape from the law." Ryan felt that the initial decision for the U.S. Government to use Barbie during Cold War counter-intelligence work, while reprehensible in light of his war-crimes, might be defended in light of national security interests. Doing so was no different from what other World War II victor nations were doing at the time, and it may have been done without thorough knowledge of Barbie's atrocities in Lyon. After those atrocities became well publicized, however, Ryan regarded it as indefensible for U.S. Counter Intelligence Corp. personnel to lie to higher U.S. authorities and help Barbie escape Europe to Bolivia rather than honor an outstanding French warrant for his arrest.

As a result of Ryan's report and personal recommendation, the U.S. government made a formal apology to France for enabling Barbie to escape French justice for thirty-three years. Although some politicians and commentators did not agree with all the conclusions or believe the apology was justified, reaction to the report was generally highly favorable, both in the U.S. and abroad. The Washington Post applauded the report's "candor and balance" and regarded it as "a credit to the Justice Department and particularly to its principal author, Allan A. Ryan, Jr." The New York Times believed the report would be one that "serves history and invites us to learn from it." The Times further wrote "How rare it is for a proud and powerful nation to admit shabby behavior." French and German newspapers also praised the report, with one noting America's "powerful and impressive capacity for democratic self-purging." The quality of Ryan's report on Klaus Barbie, in the words of OSI historian Judith Feigin, "helped establish OSI as an essential resource for persons dealing with World War II issues."

== Directors of OSI ==
Walter Rockler was the first director of OSI, serving for seven months in 1979 and 1980. From 1947 to 1949, he had successfully prosecuted Nazi-era German bankers and industrialists during the Nuremberg trials. Allan Ryan was the second director and served during its formative years from 1980 to 1983. Neal Sher was the third OSI director, serving from 1983 to 1994. He left OSI to head the American Israel Public Affairs Committee (AIPAC). The last Director was Eli Rosenbaum, who had served as a trial attorney for OSI from 1980 to 1984. After time as a corporate litigator and general counsel, he returned to OSI in 1988 as Deputy Director. He became Director in 1995 and served in that capacity until 2010, when OSI was merged with the Domestic Security Section of the Justice Department Criminal Division to form a new unit, the Human Rights and Special Prosecutions Section. Rosenbaum then became the Director of Human Rights Enforcement Strategy and Policy at HRSP.

== Awards ==
OSI was a 2021 recipient of The Elie Wiesel Award, the highest award of the United States Holocaust Memorial Museum. The award was established in 2011 and recognizes "internationally prominent individuals whose actions embody the Museum's vision of a world where people confront hate, prevent genocide, and promote human dignity."

== Principal sources ==
- Feigin, Judy, "The Office of Special Investigations: Striving for Accountability in the Aftermath of the Holocaust", U.S. Department of Justice, 2006. (The appendix includes case histories for 134 Nazi persecutors that OSI sought to have removed from the U.S.)
- Ryan, Allan A., Jr,, Quiet Neighbors- Prosecuting Nazi War Criminals In America, Harcourt Brace Jovanovich, 1984. (This is a history of OSI through the period that Ryan was director.)
- Douglas, Lawrence, The Right Wrong Man- John Demjanjuk and the Last Great Nazi War Crimes Trial, Princeton University Press, 2016.

== See also ==
- List of denaturalized former citizens of the United States
- Operation Paperclip, a US government operation to bring Nazi scientists and other select people into the United States,
- Operation Osoaviakhim, the Soviet Union's equivalent to the above
