= Neal Sher =

American lawyer (1947–2021)

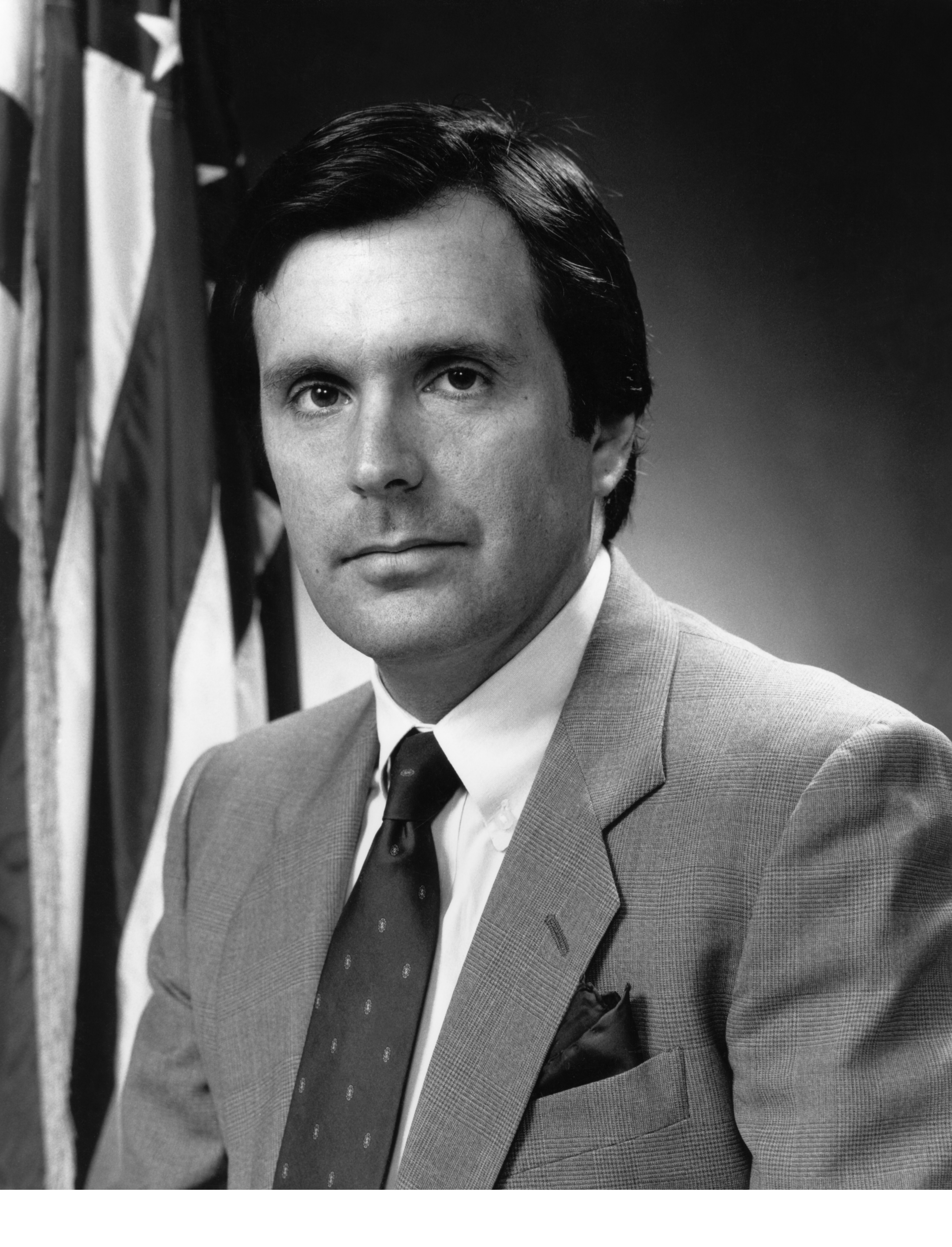
Neal M. Sher (official U.S. Department of Justice photograph, 1990)

Neal M. Sher (29 August 1947 – 3 October 2021) was an American lawyer who served as head of the Office of Special Investigations of the United States Department of Justice and as executive director of the American Israel Public Affairs Committee (AIPAC). Since 2002, he was a solo practitioner in New York City and, since 2020, in Southampton, New York, as well.

Sher graduated Cornell University in 1968 and New York University Law School in 1972. At NYU Law School, he was an Editor of the Law Review and was admitted to the Order of the Coif. He clerked for Judge Barrington D. Parker for two years, then worked in a Washington, DC law firm from 1974 to 1979, before joining the United States Department of Justice.

From 1983 to 1994, Sher headed the Office of Special Investigations (OSI), the Justice Department's Nazi prosecution unit, where he oversaw the denaturalization and deportation of dozens of onetime Nazi war criminals. His investigation of the Nazi past of former United Nations Secretary General Kurt Waldheim resulted in Sher's submission of a report to the United States Attorney General. That report, in turn, led to Waldheim's placement on the watch list of persons ineligible to enter the United States. In 1989, Sher received the Raoul Wallenberg "Hero in Our time" Award of the Shaare Tzedek Medical Center for his work. For his accomplishments in pursuing justice in the Nazi cases, Sher received numerous other awards, including: the Benjamin Cardozo Award of the Anti-Defamation League, a Special Commendation for Courage and Dedication in Pursuit of Justice of the World Jewish Congress, a Special Commendation for Pursuit of Justice of Yad Vashem, Man of the Year of both the Warsaw Ghetto Resistance Organization and the Shomrim Society, the Distinguished Service Award of the Survivors of the Riga Ghetto organization, the Humanitarian Award of Emunah Women of America, and a U.S. Department of Justice Senior Executive Service Meritorious Achievement Award.

Sher was the executive director of AIPAC from 1994 to 1996. As director, he led AIPAC's support of the Oslo Accords, sparring with rival lobbyists Zionist Organization of America over the issue. He apparently clashed with the board of directors, however, and resigned shortly after Benjamin Netanyahu's surprise victory in the 1996 Israel prime ministerial election to return to work on Holocaust-related issues.

In the documentary I have Never Forgotten You about famed Nazi hunter Simon Wiesenthal, Sher is shown criticizing Wiesenthal, saying, "There were and still remain today alive, many people who personally suffered at the hands of Joseph Mengele and to hold out hope to them, and these people held out hope, that their tormenter, their torturer, this mass murderer would be brought to justice, when the information was not accurate, I think is cruel."

From 1997 to 2000, Sher was a special adviser to Canada's war crimes prosecution unit.

In 1998, Sher became chief of staff of the International Commission on Holocaust Era Insurance Claims. He resigned in June 2002 after a Baltimore Sun investigation disclosed that he had received over $5000 for some first-class air travel to Europe, and he disclosed to the commission that he had received "unauthorized reimbursements." According to the chair, former Secretary of State Lawrence Eagleburger, Sher made "immediate and full restitution" after self-disclosing the violation.

In 2003, Sher consented to disbarment from the District of Columbia. He said he agreed to disbarment because he could not afford to litigate the matter, and remained a member of the New York bar, despite a provision of New York law, 22 NYCRR 603.3, which requires "reciprocal" disbarment for any attorney disbarred in another jurisdiction. The agreement means that there is no public record of the bar's investigation.

Sher was in the news for his representation of his friend Morris Talansky, who is a witness in the investigation of Israeli Prime Minister Ehud Olmert.

As of 2017, Sher represented a class action for the victims of the Fort Hood terror attack.

"What I hope and believe is that the announcement today by the Pentagon shows they have changed course... It's our expectation that this will resolve it and these people will get the benefits. We're going to be monitoring it and keeping a close eye on it and in touch with members of Congress to make sure this isn’t hocus-pocus and that they follow through."

Sher was admitted to practice before the US Supreme Court; the US Court of Appeals, 2nd Circuit; US District Court, Southern District of New York; US District Court, Eastern District of New York; US District Court Northern District of New York; and US District Court, District of Columbia.
