= Domestic Security Section =

Former part of the U.S. Department of Justice

The Domestic Security Section (DSS) was a component of the United States Department of Justice Criminal Division that was focused on the prosecution of significant alien smuggling organizations, complex immigration frauds, certain violent crime and firearms offenses, crimes committed under the Military Extraterritorial Jurisdiction Act, and serious human rights violations such as war crimes, genocide, and torture. DSS was the primary DOJ office responsible for pursuing justice against perpetrators of human rights violations.

In 2009, the section was merged with the Office of Special Investigations to form a new unit of the Criminal Division: the Human Rights and Special Prosecutions Section.

== Former section chiefs ==
The Domestic Security Section, before reorganization, was headed by a section chief, who in turn reported to the assistant attorney general of the Criminal Division through a deputy assistant attorney general.

A former acting chief of the section, John T. Morton, was appointed in mid-2009 by President Barack Obama as the Assistant Security of Homeland Security for the U.S. Immigration and Customs Enforcement.

== Notable cases ==
- United States v. Charles Taylor, Jr. (a.k.a. Chuckie Taylor, a.k.a. Charles McArthur Emmanuel, a.k.a. Roy Belfast) (son of Charles Taylor, former warlord of Liberia)
- United States v. Steven D. Green
- United States v. Theodore Stevens (Domestic Security Section was added after allegations of prosecutorial misconduct against original prosecution team)
