= Nová Lesná =

- Municipality
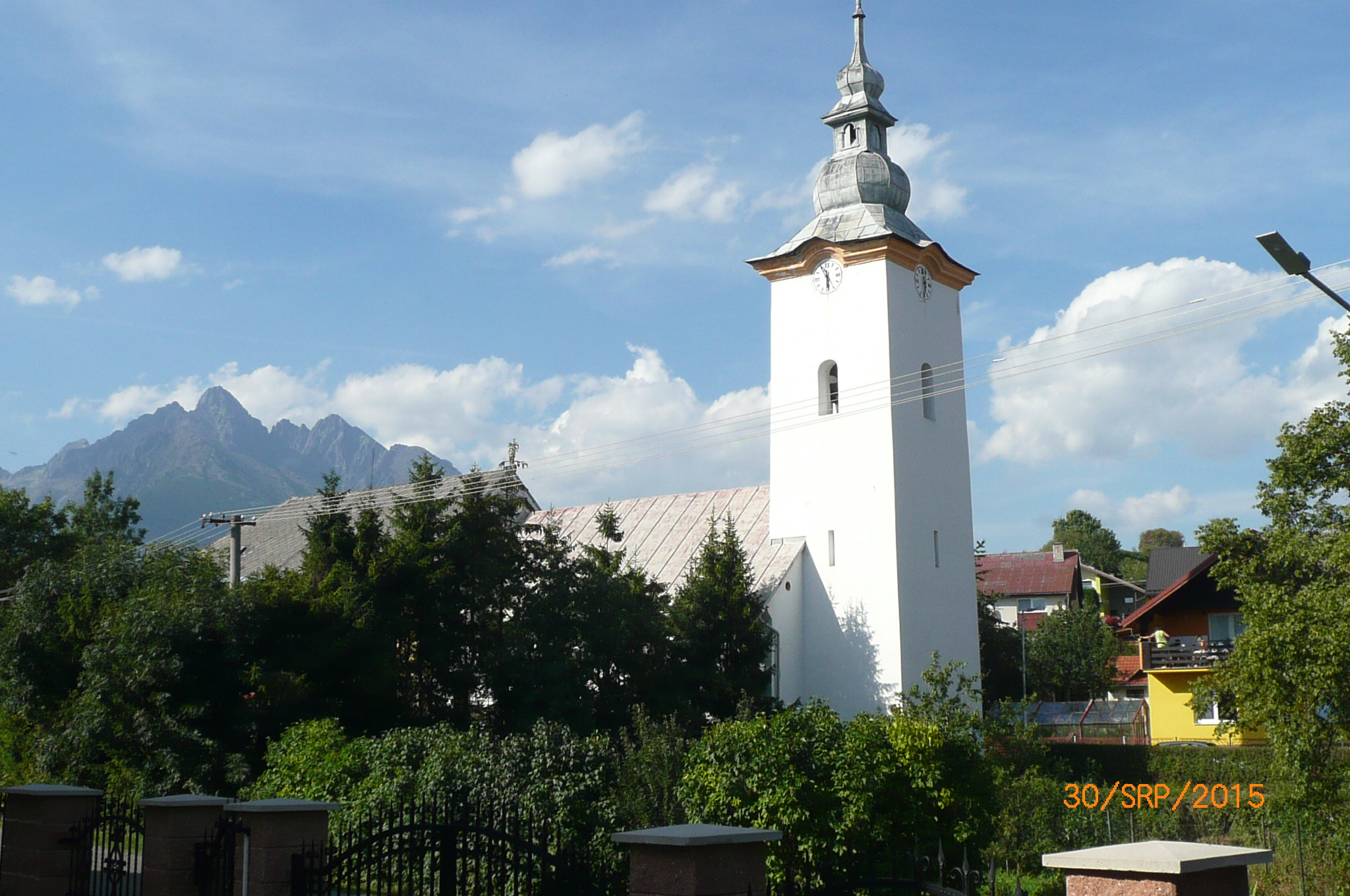

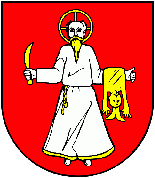
- Flag Coat of arms

- Location of Nová Lesná in the Prešov Region Location of Nová Lesná in Slovakia
- Coordinates: 49.12°N 20.27°E
- Country: Slovakia
- Region: Prešov Region
- District: Poprad District
- First mentioned: 1315

Area
  - Total: 4.16 km^{2} (1.61 sq mi)
- Elevation: 748 m (2,454 ft)

Population (2025)
  - Total: 1,621
- Time zone: UTC+1 (CET)
  - Summer (DST): UTC+2 (CEST)
- Postal code: 599 1
- Area code: +421 52
- Vehicle registration plate (until 2022): PP
- Website: www.novalesna.sk

Nová Lesná (German: Neu Walddorf,Hungarian: Alsóerdőfalva) is a village and municipality in Poprad District in the Prešov Region of northern Slovakia.

== Geography ==
The municipality lies at an altitude of 748 metres (2,454 ft) and covers an area of 4.16 km^{2} (1.61 sq mi) (2025).

== History ==
In historical records the village was first mentioned in 1315. It belonged to a German language island. The German population was expelled in 1945.

== Population ==
Population statistic (10 years)
Year	1995	2005	2015	2025
Count	1239	1559	1605	1621
Difference		+25.82%	+2.95%	+0.99%

Population statistic
Year	2024	2025
Count	1646	1621
Difference		−1.51%

It has a population of 1621 people (31 December 2025).

=== Ethnicity ===
Census 2021 (1+ %)
Ethnicity	Number	Fraction
Slovak	1519	91.67%
Romani	88	5.31%
Not found out	85	5.12%
Czech	21	1.26%
Total	1657	

In year 2021 was 1657 people by ethnicity 1519 as Slovak, 88 as Romani, 85 as Not found out, 21 as Czech, 11 as Rusyn, 7 as German, 6 as Hungarian, 3 as Other, 2 as Polish, 1 as French and 1 as Albanian.

Note on population: The difference values of population numbers in the table "Population statistic" and in the sections "Ethnicity" & "Religion" is caused by the use of various statistical methods.

=== Religion ===
Census 2021 (1+ %)
Religion	Number	Fraction
Roman Catholic Church	1031	62.22%
None	353	21.3%
Not found out	99	5.97%
Evangelical Church	72	4.35%
Eastern Orthodox Church	32	1.93%
Greek Catholic Church	27	1.63%
Total	1657	

In year 2021 was 1657 people by religion 1031 from Roman Catholic Church, 353 from None, 99 from Not found out, 72 from Evangelical Church, 32 from Eastern Orthodox Church, 27 from Greek Catholic Church, 12 from Christian Congregations in Slovakia, 7 from Other and not ascertained christian church, 6 from United Methodist Church, 4 from Other, 3 from Calvinist Church, 3 from Ad hoc movements, 2 from Jehovah's Witnesses, 2 from Church of Jesus Christ of Latter-day Saints, 1 from Jewish community, 1 from Old Catholic Church, 1 from Islam and 1 from Seventh-day Adventist Church.

== Economy and infrastructure ==
Tourism dominates the village economy. In Nová Lesná are several pensions and developed tourist infrastructure.
