= Alfred Gottfried Ochshorn =

Jewish Austrian communist, activist, fighter during Spanish Civil War

Alfred-Ochshorn

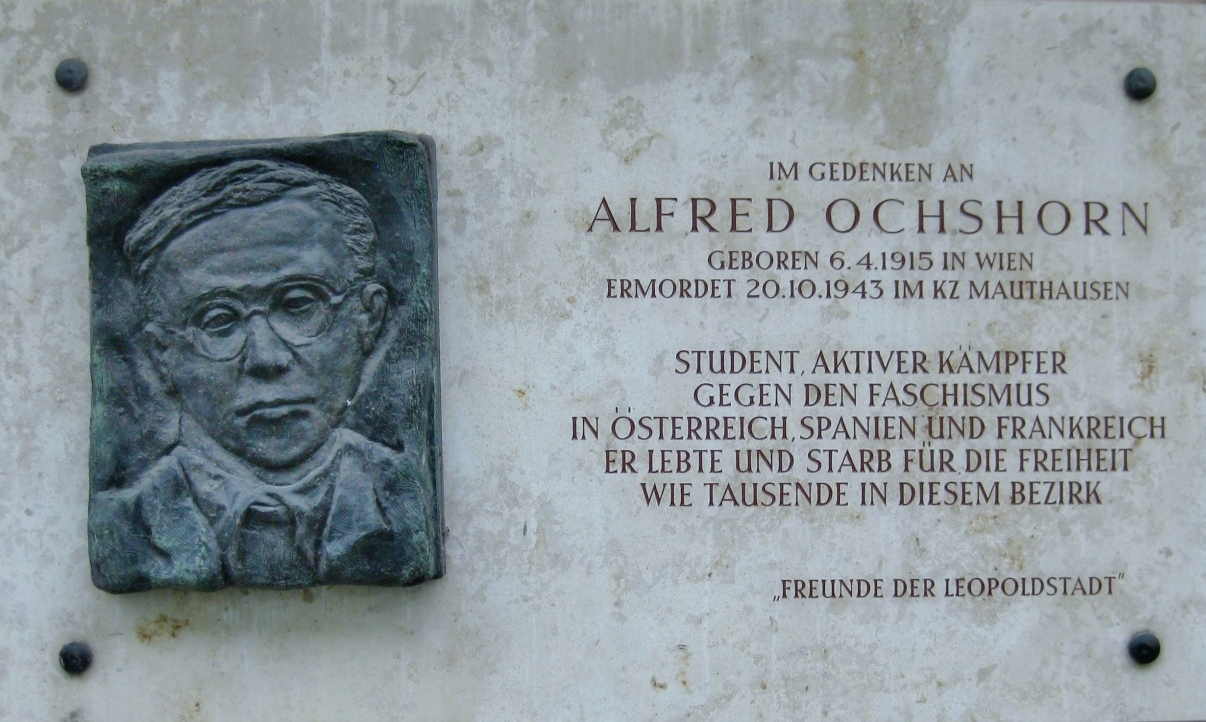
Plate for Alfred Ochshorn in Vienna

Alfred Gottfried Ochshorn (April 6, 1915 – October 20, 1943) was a Jewish Austrian communist student activist and fighter during the Spanish Civil War. At the end of the Spanish Republic he went to France where he worked as a translator for German troops while also active in forging papers to aid the French Resistance. After being betrayed by an informant, he was arrested in 1943 by the Gestapo and sent to the Mauthausen concentration camp. He was murdered at Block 5 by the 17-year-old SS guard Martin Bartesch.
