= Mikhail Gorshkow =

Estonian citizen accused of war crimes

Mikhail Gorshkow (1923–2013) was a soldier and an alleged Nazi war criminal, accused by the US Justice Department of having assisted the German occupation authorities in the mass murder of Jews in Belarus during World War II. In 2002, he fled the United States for Estonia upon being investigated for his wartime activity. He allegedly served as an interpreter and interrogator for a Gestapo unit that killed at least 3,000 Jews in the Belarusian city of Slutsk in 1942 and 1943.

An ethnic Russian born in 1923 in Estonia, Gorshkow became a naturalized United States citizen in 1963. In 2002, after the state of Florida stripped Gorshkow of his US citizenship for having lied to immigration officials fifty years earlier about his Nazi past, Gorshkow returned to Estonia. On the basis of the evidence handed over by the United States Department of Justice in 2003, Jüri Pihl, the Attorney General of Estonia, opened an investigation into Gorshkow's alleged participation in war crimes in the Slutsk ghetto in 1943. The investigation was closed in October 2011 due to inconclusive evidence. According to the Office of the Prosecutor General, the perpetrator had not been identified beyond reasonable doubt, as the possibility that more than one person with the surname Gorshkow collaborated with the Nazis could not be eliminated. Gorshkow died in Estonia in 2013.
