= Algimantas Dailidė =

Lithuanian Nazi collaborator (1921–2015)

- Born: 12 March 1921; Kaunas, Lithuania
- Died: 2015 (aged 93–94)
- Burial place: Spring Grove Cemetery in Medina, Ohio, U.S.
- Military career
- Branch: Lithuanian Security Police
- Conflicts: World War II

Algimantas Mykolas Dailidė (12 March 1921 – 2015) was a Lithuanian Nazi collaborator who was an official of the Nazi-sponsored Lithuanian Security Police (Saugumas) during World War II. After the war, Dailidė sought refuge in the United States, saying he had been a "forester". While in the United States, Dailidė lived in both Florida and Cleveland, Ohio. He was a real estate agent until he retired to Gulfport, Florida. His citizenship was revoked in 1997, and he fled to Germany in 2004.

Dailidė was born in Kaunas in 1921. He joined the Saugumas in 1941 until he fled Lithuania to Germany as a refugee in 1944. He then went to the United States in 1950 as a non-quota immigrant under a DPA visa. In 2006, a Lithuanian court convicted him of having arrested twelve Jews, including women and children, and two Poles who tried to flee from the Vilna Ghetto, and were subsequently executed. Dailidė received a 5-year prison sentence, but it was not enforced "because he is very old and does not pose danger to society". In 2008, Haaretz reported that he lived in Kirchberg, Germany. However, online databases verify that Dailidė died in 2015, and was buried at Spring Grove Cemetery in Medina, Ohio, United States, yet he was included in the list of Nazi war criminals facing possible prosecution in 2019.
