= Lawrence Douglas =

American legal scholar

- Born: Lawrence R. Douglas; October 18, 1959 (age 67); United States
- Spouse: Nancy Pick

Academic background
- Education: Brown University; Columbia University; Yale Law School

Academic work
- Institutions: United States Holocaust Memorial Museum; Amherst College

Lawrence R. Douglas (born October 18, 1959) is an American legal scholar. He teaches in the department of Law, Jurisprudence, and Social Thought at Amherst College in Amherst, Massachusetts, where he holds the James J. Grosfeld Professorship. He is an author of journalism, fiction, and nonfiction books.

== Education ==
Douglas received an A.B. from Brown University in 1982, a A.M. from Columbia University in 1986, and a J.D. from Yale Law School in 1989. At Yale, he was co-founder and co-editor-in-chief of the Yale Journal of Law & the Humanities.

== Career ==
Much of Douglas's nonfiction has focused on legal responses to state-sponsored atrocities. His two novels have focused on the question of Jewish identity.

In 2013, Douglas wrote about Guantanamo Bay detainee Abd al-Nashiri for Harper's Magazine. Douglas reviews books on legal topics for the Times Literary Supplement and is a contributing writer for The Guardian.

He has received senior fellowships from the National Endowment for the Humanities, the American Council of Learned Societies, the United States Holocaust Memorial Museum, the Institute for International Education, and the Carnegie Corporation. In 2022, he received a Berlin Prize from the American Academy in Berlin, Germany, where he was a Daimler Fellow. In 2026, he received a John Simon Guggenheim Memorial Foundation Fellowship (commonly known as the Guggenheim Fellowship).

Douglas has appeared in several documentaries, including The Accountant of Auschwitz (2018), the TV mini-series The Devil Next Door (2019), the National Geographic documentary Nazis at Nuremberg: The Lost Testimony (2023), the BBC's The Devil's Confession: the Lost Eichmann Tapes (2023), and Au coeur de l'histoire: le procès de Nuremberg (Arte, 2025).

His book The Right Wrong Man: John Demjanjuk and the Last Great Nazi War Crimes Trial was a New York Times Editors' Choice book for 2016.

His 2020 book Will He Go?: Trump and the Looming Election Meltdown in 2020 predicted many of Donald Trump's strategies for attempting to hold onto power.

His 2026 book, The Criminal State: War, Atrocity, and the Dream of International Justice examines how international law has confronted the most radical forms of state violence. Writing in Foreign Affairs, G. John Ikenberry described the book as a "masterful history."

== Personal life ==
Douglas lives in Sunderland, Massachusetts, with his wife, nonfiction author Nancy Pick.

== Fiction Honors ==
Douglas has published two novels. The Catastrophist, about a professor struggling with fatherhood, was listed on Kirkus Reviews' best books of 2006 and shared a Silver Prize in fiction from the Independent Publisher Book Awards.

The Vices, about a troubled philosopher, was listed as a best book of 2011 by New York Magazine and the New Statesman. Writing in Book Forum, Edward Park called Douglas “one of our finest novelists” and described the book as “playful and profound” and as a “duplicitous delight.”

Under the pseudonym Lars Arffsen, Douglas published The Girl with the Sturgeon Tattoo, a parody of the popular trilogy by Stig Larsson. Writing in the New York Times, Janet Maslin praised the book in a May 2011 round-up of summer beach reads, calling it a "nifty parody."

== Works ==
- The Criminal State: War, Atrocity and the Dream of International Justice. Princeton University Press. 2026. ISBN: 9780691180410
- Will He Go? Trump and the Looming Election Meltdown in 2020. Twelve Books. 2020. ISBN 978-1-5387-5187-9.
- The Right Wrong Man: John Demjanjuk and the Last Great Nazi War Crimes Trial. Princeton University Press. 2016. ISBN 978-1-4008-7315-9.
- The Memory of Judgment: Making Law and History in the Trials of the Holocaust. Yale University Press. 2005. ISBN 978-0-300-10984-9.
- Lawrence Douglas; Alexander George (2007). Sense and Nonsensibility: Lampoons of Learning and Literature. Simon and Schuster. ISBN 978-1-4165-8482-7.

Editor

- The Oxford Handbook of Transitional Justice (ed. with Jens Meierhenrich and Alexander Hinton, OUP 2025)
- Sarat, Austin; Douglas, Lawrence; Umphrey, Martha, eds. (2022). Law and Illiberalism. University of Massachusetts Press.
- Sarat, Austin; Douglas, Lawrence; Umphrey, Martha, eds. (2011). Law without Nations. Stanford University Press.
- Sarat, Austin; Douglas, Lawrence; Umphrey, Martha, eds. (2007). Law and Catastrophe. Stanford University Press.
- Sarat, Austin; Douglas, Lawrence; Umphrey, Martha, eds. (2005). The Limits of Law. Stanford University Press.
- Sarat, Austin; Douglas, Lawrence; Umphrey, Martha, eds. (2013). Law and War. Stanford University Press. ISBN 9781625343925.
- Sarat, Austin; Douglas, Lawrence; Umphrey, Martha, eds. (2014). Law and the Utopian Imagination. Stanford University Press. ISBN 9780804790819.
- Sarat, Austin; Douglas, Lawrence; Umphrey, Martha, eds. (2019). Criminals and Enemies. University of Massachusetts Press. ISBN 9781625343925.

Novels

- The Vices. Other Press. 2011. ISBN 978-1-59051-416-0.
- The Catastrophist. Other Press. 2006. ISBN 978-1-5905-1219-7.
