= Lithuanian Security Police =

Local police force in German-occupied Lithuania

The Lithuanian Security Police (LSP; Lithuanian: Lietuvos saugumo policija), also known as the Saugumas, was a local police force that operated in German-occupied Lithuania from 1941 to 1944, in collaboration with the occupational authorities. Collaborating with the Nazi Sipo (security police) and SD (intelligence agency of the SS), the unit was directly subordinate to the German Kripo (criminal police). The LSP took part in perpetrating the Holocaust in Lithuania, persecuting the Polish resistance and communist underground.

== Background and formation ==
When Soviet Union occupied Lithuania on 15 June 1940, the Lithuanian Ministry of Internal Affairs was liquidated and replaced by the Soviet NKVD. Many former employees of the Ministry were arrested and imprisoned as "enemies of the people". Foreseeing the Nazi invasion of the Soviet Union, Lithuanians organized the June Uprising, hoping to regain Lithuanian independence in the clash of the two powers. They drew up plans to restore pre-Soviet state institutions under a Provisional Government of Lithuania. On 24 June 1941, the Provisional Government recreated the pre-war Ministry of Internal Affairs with three departments – State Security, Police, and Prisons. The State Security Department was headed by Vytautas Reivytis. The government asked all those who had worked there prior to 15 June 1940 to report back for duty. Many of them had just been released from Soviet prisons.

After the German took Lithuania, it became apparent that they had no intention of granting autonomy to Lithuania. Instead, on 25 July 1941, they established a civil administration known as Generalbezirk Litauen under Generalkommissar Theodor Adrian von Renteln, and dissolved the Provisional Government on 5 August 1941. But they found the police and intelligence agencies created in the transitional period useful and incorporated them into the German security system. The former State Security Department was reorganised into the Lithuanian Security Police.

== Organization ==
=== External structure ===
The police in German-occupied Lithuania consisted of separate German and Lithuanian units. The most important German police organizations were the SiPo (security police, German: Sicherheitspolizei) and SD (security service, German: Sicherheitsdienst), commanded by Karl Jäger and headquartered in Kaunas, and the public police (German: Schutzpolizei). The major Lithuanian police organisations were the Public Police, Lithuanian Security and Criminal Police (combined at the end of 1942 into one force), Lithuanian Auxiliary Police Battalions (Lithuanian Schutzmannschaft), Railway Police and Fire Police. Lithuanian police organizations were subordinate to their respective German counterparts. Neighboring Latvia and Estonia did not have an equivalent to LSP.

The LSP was dependent on the German SiPo and SD. It had the authority to sentence suspects to up to three years. Longer sentences had to be reviewed and approved by Karl Jäger, who always increased the sentences. Wilhelm Fuchs, the new commander of Einsatzkommando 3, wanted to liquidate LSP and incorporate it into the German police, but Stasys Čenkus wrote him a letter defending LSP's usefulness and it was left undisturbed.

=== Internal structure ===
The head of the Lithuanian Security and Criminal Police was Stasys Čenkus, an agent of the Abwehr. He kept this position until the end of the German occupation. His deputy assistants were head of the Security Police Kazys Matulis and his personal secretary Vytenis Stasiškis. Petras Pamataitis headed the Criminal Police.

The LSP had a staff of approximately 400 people, 250 of them in Kaunas and about another 130 in Vilnius. Many of its members came from the fascist Iron Wolf organisation. For comparison, as of December 1943, the German SiPo and SD had 112 employees in Kaunas and 40 employees in Vilnius. The combined Lithuanian Security and Criminal Police had 886 employees in 1943.

LSP was headquartered in Kaunas. The headquarters were divided onto several departments: Organization (recruitment and employee selection), Economical and Financial (general administration), and Information (reports from other departments and agencies, registry of state enemies, archive).

LSP had six regional branches in Kaunas (headed by Albinas Čiuoderis), Vilnius (Aleksandras Lileikis), Šiauliai (Juozas Pakulis), Ukmergė (Aleksandras Braziukaitis), Marijampolė (Petras Banys) and Panevėžys (Antanas Liepa). Regional branches usually had seven commissariats:

- Guards' Commissariat – guarded buildings and prisons
- General Commissariat – general administrative functions
- Information Commissariat – screened applicants for governmental institutions, gathered operative information, created lists of state enemies, gathered information on political attitudes of local population, preparing reports and publications
- Communist Commissariat – gathered information on communists and Soviet partisans, arrested and interrogated suspects, recruited agents
- Polish Commissariat – investigated activities of illegal Polish organizations, arrested and interrogated suspects, recruited agents
- Commissariat of Ethnic Minorities – investigated activities of Russians, Belarusians and other ethnic minorities
- Reconnaissance Commissariat

Regional branches sometimes had different set of commissariats, for example Kaunas's branch had a separate commissariat for right-wing organizations.

== Activities ==
=== Persecution of communists and Polish resistance ===
The initial task of LSP was to identify and arrest Communists. In the first months of German occupation, the Communist Commissariat of the Vilnius branch, headed by Juozas Bagdonis, was especially active. In 1941 documents this commissariat is sometimes referred to as the Communist-Jewish section (Lithuanian: Komunistų-žydų sekcija). It was responsible for spying on, arresting and interrogating Communists, members of Komsomol, former Soviet government workers, NKVD collaborators, Jews and supporters of Jews. In Kaunas, the LSP arrested about 200 Communists; about 170 of them were on a list of known Communists. On 26 June 1941, this group was transferred to the Seventh Fort and executed. The next day Germans forbade Lithuanians to order executions independently.

As the war continued, the focus shifted to operations against Soviet partisans and the Polish resistance, particularly active in eastern Lithuania. In February 1942, the SiPo and SD mandated registration of Polish intelligentsia (cf. proscription list).

=== Persecution of Jews ===
In the first weeks of German occupation, the LSP focused on persecuting Communists regardless of their nationality. At the time, Jews were persecuted only if they were involved in Communist activities. Members of the LSP collected at least some evidence to support the charge. However, that quickly changed and Jews became persecuted solely because of their ethnicity. The LSP targeted Jews and suspected Jews, supporters of Jews, people evading imprisonment in the ghettos, escapees from ghettos, or those who violated the Nazi racial laws.

The activities of the LSP offices in major cities (Vilnius, Kaunas) and in the provinces differed in principle. LSP officers in major cities would most often study more complicated cases of political and strategic character, and so did not directly participate in mass killings of Jews. After interrogation, Jews were handed over either to the Gestapo or to the Ypatingasis būrys, which then transported them to the mass murder site at Paneriai or another places of mass execution. The LSP offices in the provinces took an active role in the Holocaust and, altogether, were more active. Here, the LSP officials would not only conduct interrogations, but also organize mass arrests, transport Jews to their imprisonment or execution, and carry out their execution.

== Postwar developments ==
At the end of the war many members of the Lithuanian Security Police fled to Western Europe, notably to Germany. In 1955, the former commander of its Vilnius branch, Aleksandras Lileikis, emigrated to the United States, where he obtained citizenship, of which he was stripped in 1996. In Lithuania, Lileikis's trial was postponed several times due to his poor health; he died at age 93 without having been tried. Lileikis gave interviews to the press and published a memoir Pažadinto laiko pėdsakais (ISBN 9789986847281) in which he denied any wrongdoing.

Kazys Gimžauskas, Lileikis' deputy, returned to Lithuania after US authorities began to investigate him in 1996, and was convicted in 2001 of participation in genocide. In 2006, Algimantas Dailidė was convicted in Lithuania of persecuting and arresting two Poles and 12 Jews while he was a member of Lithuanian Security Police.

== See also ==
- Lithuanian collaboration with Nazi Germany
