= Yaad Rotem =

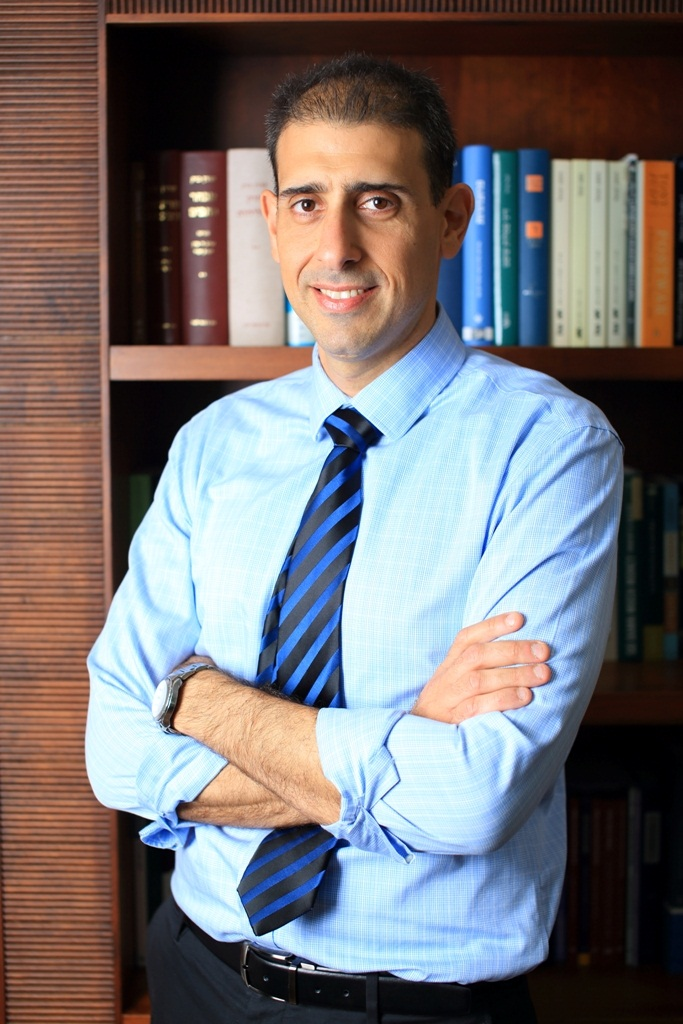
Yaad Rotem

Yaad Rotem (Hebrew: יעד רותם; born in 1973) is Dean and professor of law at the College of Law and Business (CLB) in Ramat-Gan, Israel. He is an expert in the fields of private international law (conflict of laws), corporate bankruptcy and reorganization law and corporate law.

== Biography ==
Rotem was born in 1973 and was raised in Haifa, Israel. During the years 1978-1983 he resided with his parents in Nigeria.

Rotem studied at the Ironi H High School in Haifa. He was a basketball player for Maccabi Haifa and Maccabi Ramat-Gan and was also included in the Israeli National Youth team.

In 1998 Rotem earned his Bachelor of Laws (LL.B.), magna cum laude, from the University of Haifa Faculty of Law. In this year he also earned a Bachelor of Arts Degree (B.A.) in Economics from the University of Haifa Economics Department. He was a member of the editorial board of Mishpat U'Mimshal—the Faculty's law review—for two years. Throughout his studies at the faculty of law he was included in the dean's list. He also won the Meirhoff Scholarship.

Rotem clerked for one year at the Supreme Court of Israel for Justice Dalia Dorner. In 2000 he was admitted into the Israeli Bar, and then returned to the Supreme Court and served for two more years as Justice Dorner's senior legal clerk. While at the court Rotem completed a Master of Laws degree the Hebrew University of Jerusalem. During his two years at the Hebrew University's faculty of law he was a member of the editorial board of Mishpatim—the faculty's law review—and also won first prize the Judge Julian W. Mack Essay Writing Competition held at the faculty. In 2004 he won the Peter Lougheed Scholarship for Canadian Studies.

Rotem was an adjunct lecturer at the University of Haifa, the Interdisciplinary Centre in Herzliya, and at the College of Management in RishonLe'ziyon. In 2005 Rotem completed a doctorate at the Hebrew University of Jerusalem Faculty of Law under the supervision of Professor Zohar Goshen.

In 2005 Rotem joined the faculty of the College of Law and Business in Ramat-Gan. During June 2011 to May 2012 Rotem was a visiting scholar at the University of California, Berkeley.

During 2010–2011 Rotem served as head of the business law program at the College of Law and Business.

In 2012 he was appointed as vice dean of the law school and since April 2015 he serves as the dean.

In 2008 Rotem served as a special consultant to the Israeli National Official Inquiry Committee investigating the treatment of Holocaust survivors by the State of Israel. In 2009 he served as s special consultant to the Israeli National Official Inquiry Committee investigating the evacuation of Gaza and Northern Samaria.

In September 2015 Rotem was appointed as a law professor by the Council for Higher Education.

Rotem also provides legal counseling to the private sector.

He is married to Anat Rotem, a lawyer, and the father of three children.

== Research ==
Rotem's research focuses on governmental or regulatory concessions extended by the government to businesses in financial distress. A regulatory concession may help the business and its claimholders—creditors, employees and shareholders—but it also undermines the interest of the general public, represented by the relevant regulator.

Rotem suggested a way to balance these conflicting interests and minimize the harm to the public interest and to the claimholders. He claimed that when forced to extend a regulatory concession the government should be made a formal claimant of the firm seeking the concession. The purpose of this approach is, first, to ensure that the government's entitlements against the financially distressed firm mirror its unique position as a potential investor with external interests that relate generally to the public. The general public can be compensated directly, not only indirectly, for its "investment" in the financially distressed business. Second, to deter potential firms from seeking government concessions. Third, to demonstrate equal treatment to a firm receiving a regulatory concession and to firms which do not receive such a concession. Fourth, to compensate the general public for any possible "residual" harm to its welfare as a result of any subsequent breach of the regulatory regime which may unavoidably occur once the regulatory concession is extended and the general regulatory scheme is breached.

Rotem's research also focuses on private international law (conflict of laws, in US terms). His research focuses on the effects of extraterritorial regulation, the jurisdiction of local courts to adjudicate civil lawsuits against foreign defendants; the recognition of foreign judgments; and choice of law in collective action and derivative action lawsuits.

Another area of Rotem's research focuses on the financial distress of small and medium-sized businesses. Rotem analyzed the phenomenon of "The Phoenix Syndrome" under which shareholders of small to medium-sized business transfer the assets of their financially distressed business to a new enterprise while hiding such a transfer from the unsecured creditors of the business, thus securing, at least for a limited period of time, the possibility of continuing operation of their business.

Rotem explained the complexities arising in such situations and offered a novel regulatory solution taking into consideration the costs associated with opting to a formal rehabilitation procedure for financially distressed small- to medium-sized businesses.

== Selected publications ==
- Governmental Concessions in Corporate Bankruptcy Proceedings: A New Approach, 50 AMERICAN BUSINESS LAW JOURNAL 337-411 (2013).
- The Law Applicable to a Derivative Action on Behalf of a Foreign Corporation—Corporate Law in Conflict, CORNELL INT'L L. J. 321 (2013).
- The Problem of Selective or Sporadic Recognition: A New Economic Rationale for the Law of Foreign Country Judgments, 10 CHI. J. INT'L L. 505 (2010).
- Economic Regulation and the Presumption against Extraterritoriality—A New Justification, 3 WM. & MARY POL'Y REV. 229 (2012).
- Incorporation Rules, 10 REVIEW OF LAW & ECONOMICS 1-30 (2014) [with Adi Ayal].
- Small Business Financial Distress and the “Phoenix Syndrome”—A Reevaluation, 22 INT'L INSOLVENCY REV. 1 (2013).
- Anticompetitive Patents: An Incorporation Solution, 4 JOURNAL OF ANTITRUST ENFORCEMENT 134-156 (2016) [with Adi Ayal].
- Pursuing Preservation of Pre-Bankruptcy Entitlements: Corporate Bankruptcy Law's Self-Executing Mechanisms, 5 BERKELEY BUSINESS LAW JOURNAL 79-130 (2008).
