= Edward Stutman =

American lawyer (1945–2005)

Edward Alan Stutman (April 6, 1945 – September 17, 2005) was a senior trial attorney at the Justice Department of the United States who became known for prosecuting suspected Nazis.

The 26 years of his career included work for the Justice Department's Office of Special Investigation and Stutman specialized in prosecuting Nazis of the World War II era living in the United States. He won 13 cases where he had filed for the US citizenship of suspected Nazi war criminals to be revoked. Among them was the 2001 case against John Demjanjuk.
