= Kurt Schrimm =

German prosecutor

Kurt Schrimm (born 29 June 1949 in Stuttgart) is a German prosecutor. From September 2000 to September 2015 he was head of the Central Office of the State Justice Administrations for the Investigation of National Socialist Crimes in Ludwigsburg.

== Life ==
After studying law, he joined the higher judicial service of the State of Baden-Württemberg as a Gerichtsassessor at the Landgericht Stuttgart in 1979. In 1982, he became Staatsanwalt (i. e. State Prosecutor). Since 1986, he held the position of public prosecutor for the investigation of murders in connection with Nazi crimes of violence for the entire district of Oberlandesgericht Stuttgart. He was investigating against Oberscharführer Josef Schwammberger, who was arrested in 1987 and sentenced to life imprisonment in 1992, and also against Friedrich Engel, labelled as the "butcher of Genoa" by the international media.

In 1998 Schrimm was appointed Oberstaatsanwalt (i. e. Superior Prosecutor) and from the end of September 2000 to the end of September 2015 headed the Central office of the State Justice administration for the Investigation of national socialist crimes in Ludwigsburg, succeeding Willi Dressen. In 2019, he was promoted to Leitender Oberstaatsanwalt (i. e. Chief Superior Prosecutor).

On 6 April 2013 Schrimm as head of the Central Office announced that his authority was going to start preliminary investigations against 50 former wardens of Auschwitz-Birkenau extermination camp for complicity in murder. Since the judgement against John Demjanjuk, a security guard at the Sobibor extermination camp, he considered it promising to prosecute concentration camp wardens even in cases where no testimony for direct complicity was available.

When Kurt Schrimm retired, Jens Rommel became his successor as head of the Central Office in October 2015.

In 2016, Schrimm was awarded the Verdienstorden des Landes Baden-Württemberg (State of Baden-Württemberg Order of Merit).

He is married and has two grown-up children.

== Literature ==
- Annette Weinke: A company is investigating itself, the history of the Central Office Ludwigsburg 1958-2008. (Research Centre Ludwigsburg; 13), Scientific book company, Darmstadt 2008, ISBN 978-3-534-21950-6

== Links ==
- Justice Minister Goll congratulates Kurt Schrimm to ten-year tenure as head of the Central Office for the Investigation of National Socialist Crimes, Ministry of Justice of Baden-Württemberg, 24. September 2010 (with CV)
- justice. Portrait: Nazi hunter Kurt Schrimm, in Hamburger Morgenpost, May 12, 2009
- War crimes. Grounded for Nazi elders, in Focus, 14. May 2009
- "Nazi workup. Nazi hunter with the past". einestages. November 28, 2008. Archived from the original on March 6, 2014.
