= John Demjanjuk =

Ukrainian guard at Nazi death camps (1920–2012)

- Джон Дем'янюк
- Demjanjuk in his Trawniki card, 1940s
- Born: Ivan Mykolaiovych Demjanjuk; 3 April 1920; Dubovi Makharyntsi, Kiev Governorate, Soviet Ukraine
- Died: 17 March 2012 (aged 91); Bad Feilnbach, Bavaria, Germany
- Citizenship: Soviet Ukraine (until 1922); Soviet Union (1922–?); United States (1958–1981, 1998–2002); Ukraine (from 1991)
- Occupation: Autoworker
- Spouse: Vera Kowlowa
- Children: 3
- Status: Deceased
- Convictions: Israel (overturned): War crimes; Crimes against humanity; Crimes against the Jewish people; Germany (not final): Accessory to murder (28,060 counts)
- Penalty: Israel: Death (overturned); Germany: 5 years imprisonment (not final)
- Military career
- Allegiance: Soviet Union; Germany
- Branch: Red Army; Schutzstaffel

John Demjanjuk (Note: Ukrainian: Джон Дем'янюк) (born Ivan Mykolaiovych Demjanjuk (Note: Ukrainian: Іван Миколайович Дем'янюк) 3 April 1920 – 17 March 2012) was a Trawniki and guard at Sobibor extermination camp, Majdanek, and Flossenbürg. Demjanjuk became the center of global media attention in the 1980s, when he was tried and convicted in Israel after being identified as "Ivan the Terrible", a notoriously cruel watchman at Treblinka extermination camp. Demjanjuk was sentenced to death by hanging in 1988. In 1993, the verdict was overturned. Shortly before his death, he was tried and convicted in the Federal Republic of Germany as an accessory to the 28,060 murders that occurred during his service at Sobibor.

Born in Soviet Ukraine, Demjanjuk was conscripted into the Red Army in 1940. He fought in World War II and was taken prisoner by the Germans in spring 1942, becoming a Trawniki collaborator. After training, he served at Sobibor extermination camp and at least two concentration camps. After the war, he married a woman he met in a West German displaced persons camp, and emigrated with her and their daughter to the United States. They settled in Seven Hills, Ohio, where he worked in an auto factory and raised three children. Demjanjuk became a US citizen in 1958.

In 1977, Demjanjuk was accused of war crimes. Based on eyewitness testimony by Holocaust survivors in Israel, he was identified as the notorious Ivan the Terrible from Treblinka. Demjanjuk was extradited to Israel in 1986 for trial. In 1988, Demjanjuk was convicted and sentenced to death. He maintained his innocence, claiming that it was a case of mistaken identity. In 1993, the verdict was overturned by the Israeli Supreme Court, based on new evidence that cast reasonable doubt over his identity as Ivan the Terrible. Although the judges agreed there was sufficient evidence to show that Demjanjuk had served at Sobibor, Israel declined to prosecute. In September 1993, Demjanjuk was allowed to return to Ohio. In 1999, US prosecutors again sought to deport Demjanjuk for having been a concentration camp guard, and his citizenship was revoked in 2002. In 2009, Germany requested his extradition for over 27,900 counts of acting as an accessory to murder, one for each person killed at Sobibor during the time when he was alleged to have served there as a guard. He was deported from the US to Germany in that same year. In 2011, he was convicted and sentenced to five years in prison.

According to legal scholar Lawrence Douglas, in spite of serious missteps along the way, the German verdict brought the case "to a worthy and just conclusion". After the conviction, Demjanjuk was released pending appeal. He lived at a German nursing home in Bad Feilnbach, where he died in 2012. Having died before a final judgment on his appeal could be issued, Demjanjuk remains technically innocent under German law. In 2020, a photograph album by Sobibor guard Johann Niemann was made public; some historians have suggested that a guard who appears in two photos may have been Demjanjuk.

== Background ==
Demjanjuk was born in Dubovi Makharyntsi (formerly Kiev Governorate, presently Koziatyn district, Vinnytsia Oblast), a farming village in the western part of Soviet Ukraine. Both of his parents were unable to work, with his father having been wounded during World War I and his mother being affected by chronic illness, due to which Demjanjuk had to drop out of elementary school. His boyhood coincided with the Holodomor famine, due to which Demjanjuk's family moved to a collective farm near Moscow. Both in Dubovi and on the collective farm, he worked as a tractor and truck driver. In 1938, Demjanjuk joined Komsomol, although Demjanjuk claimed during his later trial that he was rejected because he did not own underwear. In 1940, he was drafted into the Red Army. After a battle in eastern Crimea, he was taken prisoner by the Germans and was held in a camp for Soviet prisoners of war in Chełm.

According to German records, Demjanjuk most likely arrived at Trawniki concentration camp to be trained as a camp guard for the Nazis on 13 June 1942. He was assigned to a manorial estate called Okzów on 22 September 1942, but returned to Trawniki on 14 October. He was transferred to Majdanek concentration camp, where he was disciplined on 18 January 1943. He was sent back to Trawniki and on 26 March 1943 he was assigned to Sobibor concentration camp. On 1 October 1943, he was transferred to Flossenbürg, where he served until at least 10 December 1944.

Demjanjuk later claimed to have been drafted into the Russian Liberation Army in 1944; however, an investigation conducted in the 1990s by the US Office of Special Investigations (OSI) found this to be a cover story. OSI was unable to establish Demjanjuk's whereabouts from December 1944 to the end of the war. After the end of the war, Demjanjuk spent time in several displaced persons (DP) camps in Germany. Initially, Demjanjuk hoped to emigrate to Argentina or Canada; however, under the Displaced Persons Act of 1948, he applied to move to the United States. His application stated that he had worked as a driver in the town of Sobibór in eastern Poland; the nearby Sobibor extermination camp was named after the village. Demjanjuk later claimed this was a coincidence, and said that he picked the name Sobibor from an atlas owned by a fellow applicant because it had a large Soviet population. Historian Hans-Jürgen Bömelburg observed in regard to Demjanjuk that Nazi war criminals sometimes tried to evade prosecution after the war by presenting themselves as victims of Nazi persecution rather than as the perpetrators.

Demjanjuk found a job as a driver in a displaced persons camp in the Bavarian city of Landshut, and was subsequently transferred to camps in other southern German cities, until ending up in Feldafing near Munich in May 1951. There he met Vera Kowlowa, another DP, and they married. Demjanjuk, his wife and daughter arrived in New York City aboard the USS General W. G. Haan on 9 February 1952. They moved to Indiana, and later settled in the Cleveland suburb of Seven Hills, Ohio. There he became a United Auto Workers (UAW) diesel engine mechanic at the nearby Ford automobile factory, where a friend from Regensburg had found work. His wife found work at a General Electric facility, and the two had two more children. On 14 November 1958, Demjanjuk became a naturalized citizen of the United States and legally changed his name from Ivan to John.

== Loss of US citizenship and extradition to Israel ==
=== Investigation by INS and OSI ===
In 1975, Michael Hanusiak, the American editor of Ukrainian News, presented US Senator Jacob Javits of New York with a list of 70 ethnic Ukrainians living in the United States who were suspected of having collaborated with Germans in World War II; Javits sent the list to US Immigration and Naturalization Service (INS). Its investigation reduced the list to nine individuals, including Demjanjuk. Hanusiak claimed that Soviet newspapers and archives had provided the names during his visit to Kyiv in 1974; however, INS suspected that Hanusiak, a member of the Communist Party USA, had received the list from the KGB. It chose to investigate the names as leads. Hanusiak claimed that Demjanjuk had been a guard at Sobibor concentration and death camp. INS quickly discovered that Demjanjuk had listed his place of domicile from 1937 to 1943 as Sobibor on his US visa application of 1951. This was considered circumstantial corroboration of Hanusiak's claims, but its agents were unable to find witnesses in the US who could identify Demjanjuk.

INS sent photographs to the Israeli government of the nine persons alleged by Hanusiak to have been involved in crimes against Jews: the government's agents asked survivors of Sobibor and Treblinka if they could identify Demjanjuk based on his visa application picture. While none recognized the name Ivan Demjanjuk, and no survivors of Sobibor identified his photograph, nine survivors of Treblinka identified Demjanjuk as "Ivan the Terrible", so named because of his cruelty as a guard operating the gas chamber at Treblinka. Lawyers at the US Office of Special Investigations (OSI) in the Department of Justice valued the identifications made by these survivors, as they had interacted with and seen "Ivan the Terrible" over a protracted period of time. They also gained an additional identification of the visa photo as Demjanjuk by Otto Horn, a former SS guard at Treblinka.

In August 1977, the Justice Department submitted a request to the US District Court for the Northern District of Ohio to revoke Demjanjuk's citizenship, based on his concealment on his 1951 immigration application of having worked at Nazi death camps. While the government was preparing for trial, Hanusiak published pictures of an ID card identifying Demjanjuk as having been a Trawniki man and guard at Sobibor in News from Ukraine. Given that eyewitnesses attested to Demjanjuk having been Ivan the Terrible at Treblinka decades before, whereas documentary evidence seemed to indicate that he had served at Sobibor with little notoriety, OSI considered dropping the proceeding against Demjanjuk to focus on higher profile cases. But OSI's new director Allan Ryan chose to go ahead with the prosecution of Demjanjuk as Ivan the Terrible. In 1979, three guards from Sobibor gave sworn depositions that they knew Demjanjuk to have been a guard there, and two identified his photograph. OSI did not submit these depositions into evidence and took them as a further indication that Demjanjuk was Ivan the Terrible, though none of the guards mentioned Demjanjuk having been at Treblinka.

=== Deportation and extradition proceedings ===
The proceeding opened with the prosecution calling historian Earl F. Ziemke, who reconstructed the situation on the Eastern Front in 1942 and showed that it would have been possible for Demjanjuk to have been captured at the Battle of Kerch and arrive in Trawniki that same year. The authenticity of the Trawniki card was affirmed by US government experts who examined the original document as well as by Wolfgang Scheffler of the Free University of Berlin during the hearing, Scheffler also testified to the crimes committed by Trawniki men and that it was possible that Demjanjuk had been moved between Sobibor and Treblinka. Additionally, the former paymaster at Trawniki, Heinrich Schaefer, stated in a deposition that such cards were standard issue at Trawniki. Five Holocaust survivors from Treblinka identified Demjanjuk as having been at Treblinka and having been "Ivan the Terrible". Additionally, OSI submitted the testimony of former SS guard Horn identifying Demjanjuk as having been at Treblinka.

Although Demjanjuk's Trawniki card only documented that he had been at Sobibor, the prosecution argued that he could have shuttled between the camps and that Treblinka had been omitted due to administrative sloppiness. During the trial, Demjanjuk admitted to having lied on his US visa application but claimed that it was out of fear of being returned to the Soviet Union and denied having been a concentration camp guard. Demjanjuk instead claimed to have been a German prisoner who completed forced labor. The defense also submitted the statement of Feodor Fedorenko, a Ukrainian guard at Treblinka, which stated that Fedorenko could not recall having seen Demjanjuk at Treblinka. Demjanjuk's citizenship was revoked in 1981 for having lied about his past, with the judge persuaded especially by the testimony of Otto Horn. In 1982, Demjanjuk was jailed for 10 days after failing to appear for a hearing. Demjanjuk subsequently requested political asylum in the United States rather than deportation. His application for asylum was denied on 31 May 1984.

Demjanjuk's defense was supported by the Ukrainian community and various Eastern European émigré groups; Demjanjuk's supporters alleged that he was the victim of a communist conspiracy and raised over two million dollars for his defense. Much of the money was raised by a Cleveland-based Holocaust denier Jerome Brentar, who also recommended Demjanjuk's lawyer Mark O'Connor. The first day of the denaturalization trial was accompanied by a protest of 150 Ukrainian-Americans who called the trial "a Soviet trial in an American court" and burned a Soviet flag. Demjanjuk also attracted the support of conservative political figures such as Pat Buchanan and Ohio congressman James Traficant. Others, particularly American Jews, were outraged by the presence of Demjanjuk in the United States and vocally supported his deportation. Writer Lawrence Douglas has called the case "the most highly publicized denaturalization proceeding in American history."

In October 1983, Israel issued an extradition request for Demjanjuk to stand trial on Israeli soil under the Nazis and Nazi Collaborators (Punishment) Law of 1950 for crimes allegedly committed at Treblinka. In April 1985, he was detained and held at United States Medical Center for Federal Prisoners in Springfield, Missouri. Demjanjuk appealed his extradition; in a hearing on 8 July 1985, Demjanjuk's defense attorneys claimed that the evidence against him had been manufactured by the KGB, that Demjanjuk was never at Treblinka, and that the court had no authority to consider Israel's request for extradition. The appeals court found probable cause that Demjanjuk "committed murders of uncounted numbers of prisoners" and allowed the extradition to take place. The United States Supreme Court declined to hear Demjanjuk's appeal on 25 February 1986, allowing the extradition to move forward. Demjanjuk was deported to Israel on 28 February 1986.

== Trial in Israel ==
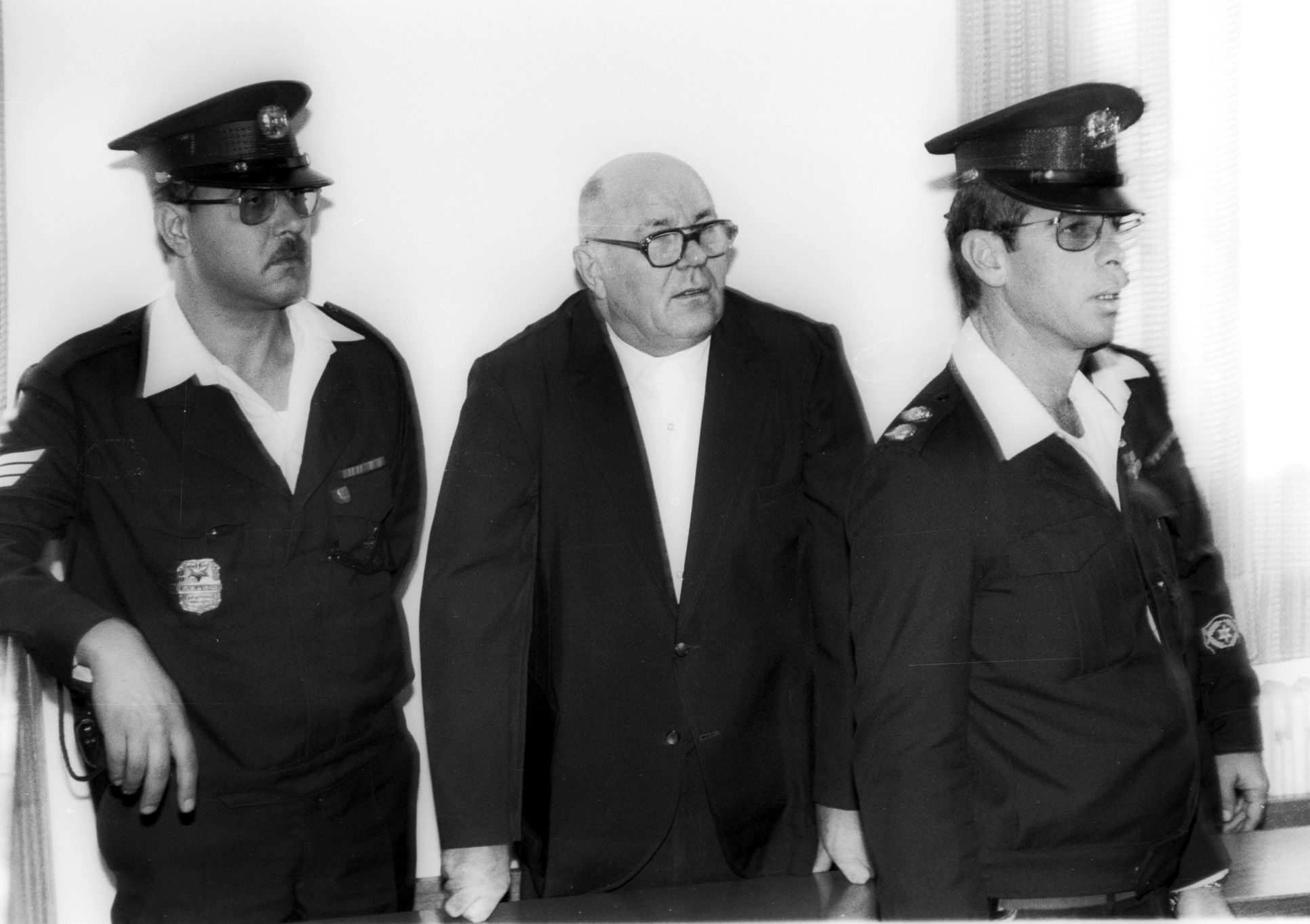
Demjanjuk trial opens at the Jerusalem District Court on 26 November 1986

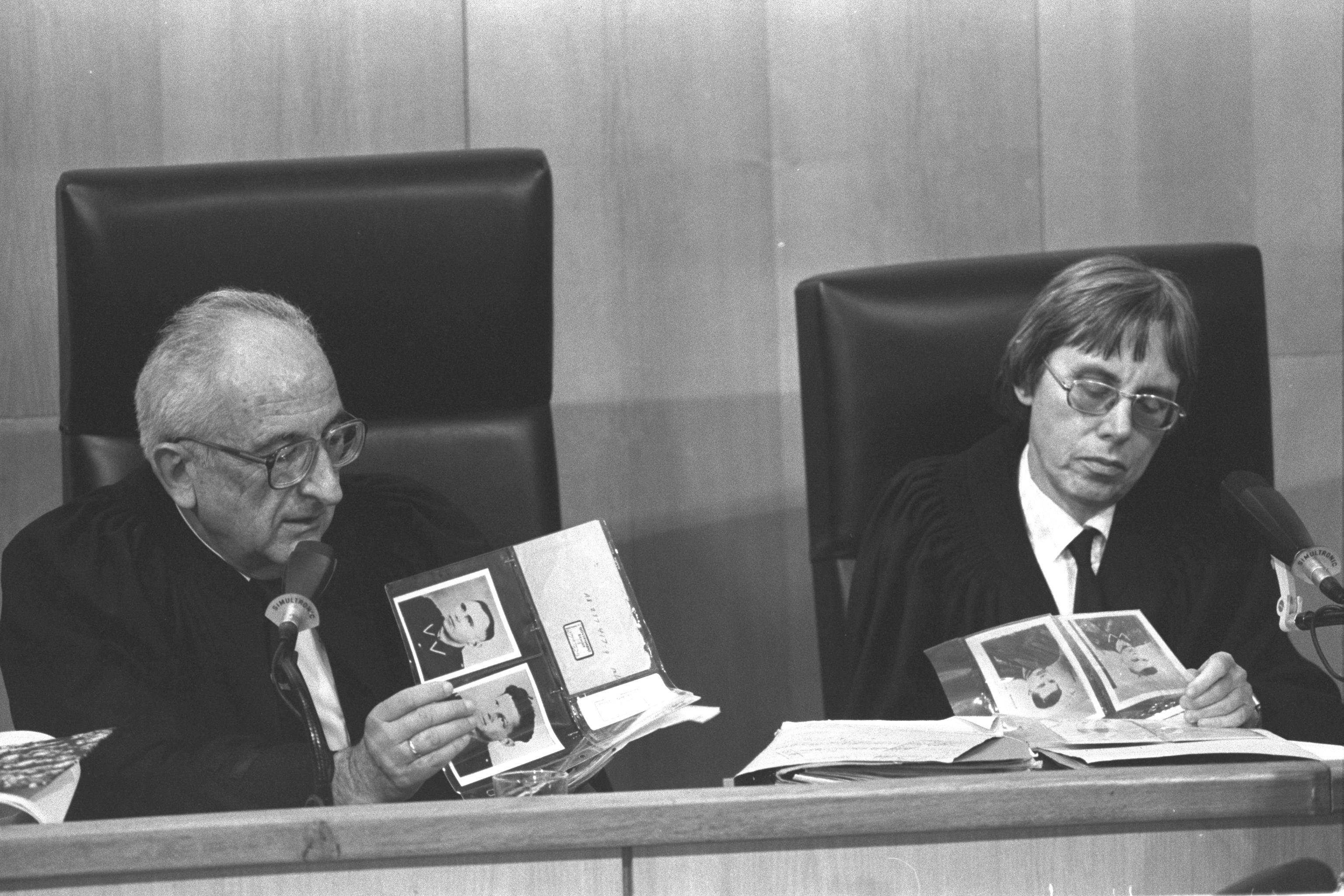
Judges Dov Levin and Dalia Dorner review evidence during the trial, 23 February 1987

Demjanjuk's trial took place in the Jerusalem District Court between 26 November 1986 and 18 April 1988, before a special tribunal comprising Israeli Supreme Court Judge Dov Levin and Jerusalem District Court Judges Zvi Tal and Dalia Dorner. The prosecution conceived of the trial as a didactic trial on the Holocaust in the manner of the earlier trial of Adolf Eichmann. It was the first televised trial in Israeli history. Despite initially attracting minimal attention, once survivor testimony began the trial became a "national obsession" and was followed widely throughout Israel and the United States. On 6 April 1987, John Stolz (or Stoltz), a 65-year-old German SS officer who had worked at a concentration camp in Poland, hanged himself in his basement in Ohio after receiving a letter from the OSI. His son Edwin said he'd been terrified of being put through the same ordeal as Demjanjuk.

=== Prosecution case ===
The prosecution team consisted of Israeli State Attorney Yonah Blatman, lead attorney Michael Shaked of the Jerusalem District Attorney's Office, and the attorneys Michael Horovitz and Dennis Gouldman of the International Section of the State Attorney's Office. According to prosecutors, Demjanjuk had been recruited into the Soviet army in 1940, and had fought until he was captured by German troops in eastern Crimea in May 1942. He was then brought to a German prisoner of war camp in Chełm in July 1942. Prosecutors claimed that Demjanjuk volunteered to collaborate with the Germans and was sent to the camp at Trawniki, where he was trained to guard prisoners as part of Operation Reinhard. The principal allegation was that three former prisoners identified Demjanjuk as "Ivan the Terrible" of Treblinka, who operated the petrol engines sending gas to the death chamber. The prosecution alleged that Demjanjuk had listed Sobibor on his US immigration application in an attempt to cover up his presence at Treblinka.

Prosecutors based part of these allegations on an ID card referred to as the "Trawniki card". Because the Soviet Union generally refused to cooperate with the Israeli prosecutions, this ID card was obtained from the USSR and provided to Israel by American industrialist Armand Hammer, a close associate of several Kremlin leaders, whose help had been requested by the personal appeal of Israeli president Shimon Peres. The defense claimed that the card was forged by Soviet authorities to discredit Demjanjuk. The card had Demjanjuk's photograph, which he identified as his picture at the time. The prosecution called expert witnesses to testify on the authenticity of the card including its signatures by various Nazi officers, paper, and ink. The defense used some evidence supplied by the Soviets to support their case while calling other pieces of evidence supplied by the Soviets "forgeries".

The prosecution relied heavily on the testimony of Holocaust survivors to establish that Demjanjuk had been at Treblinka, five of whom were put on the stand. Four of the survivors who had originally identified Demjanjuk's photograph had died before the trial began. The testimony of one of these witnesses, Pinhas Epstein, had been barred as unreliable in US denaturalization trial of former camp guard Feodor Fedorenko, while another, Gustav Boraks, sometimes appeared confused on the stand. The most important of these was Eliyahu Rosenberg. Asked by the prosecution if he recognized Demjanjuk, Rosenberg asked that the defendant remove his glasses "so I can see his eyes". Rosenberg approached and peered closely at Demjanjuk's face. When Demjanjuk smiled and offered his hand, Rosenberg recoiled and shouted "Grozny!", meaning "Terrible" in Polish and Russian. Rosenberg stated: "Ivan, I say it unhesitatingly, without the slightest shadow of a doubt. It is Ivan from Treblinka, from the gas chambers, the man I am looking at now." Rosenberg further told the court, glaring at Demjanjuk, "I saw his eyes, I saw those murderous eyes." Rosenberg then exclaimed directly to Demjanjuk: "How dare you put out your hand, murderer that you are!" It was later learned that Rosenberg had previously testified in a 1947 deposition that "Ivan the Terrible" had been killed in 1943 during a Treblinka prisoner uprising. During the trial, Demjanjuk was again identified on the photo spread by Otto Horn, a former German SS guard at Treblinka.

Other controversial evidence included Demjanjuk's tattoo. Demjanjuk admitted the scar under his armpit was an SS blood group tattoo, which he removed after the war, as did many SS men to avoid summary execution by the Soviets. The blood group tattoo was applied by army medics and used by combat personnel in the Waffen-SS and its foreign volunteers and conscripts because they were likely to need blood or give transfusions. There is no evidence that POWs trained as police auxiliaries at Trawniki were required to receive such tattoos, although it was an option for those that volunteered.

=== Defense case and Demjanjuk's testimony ===
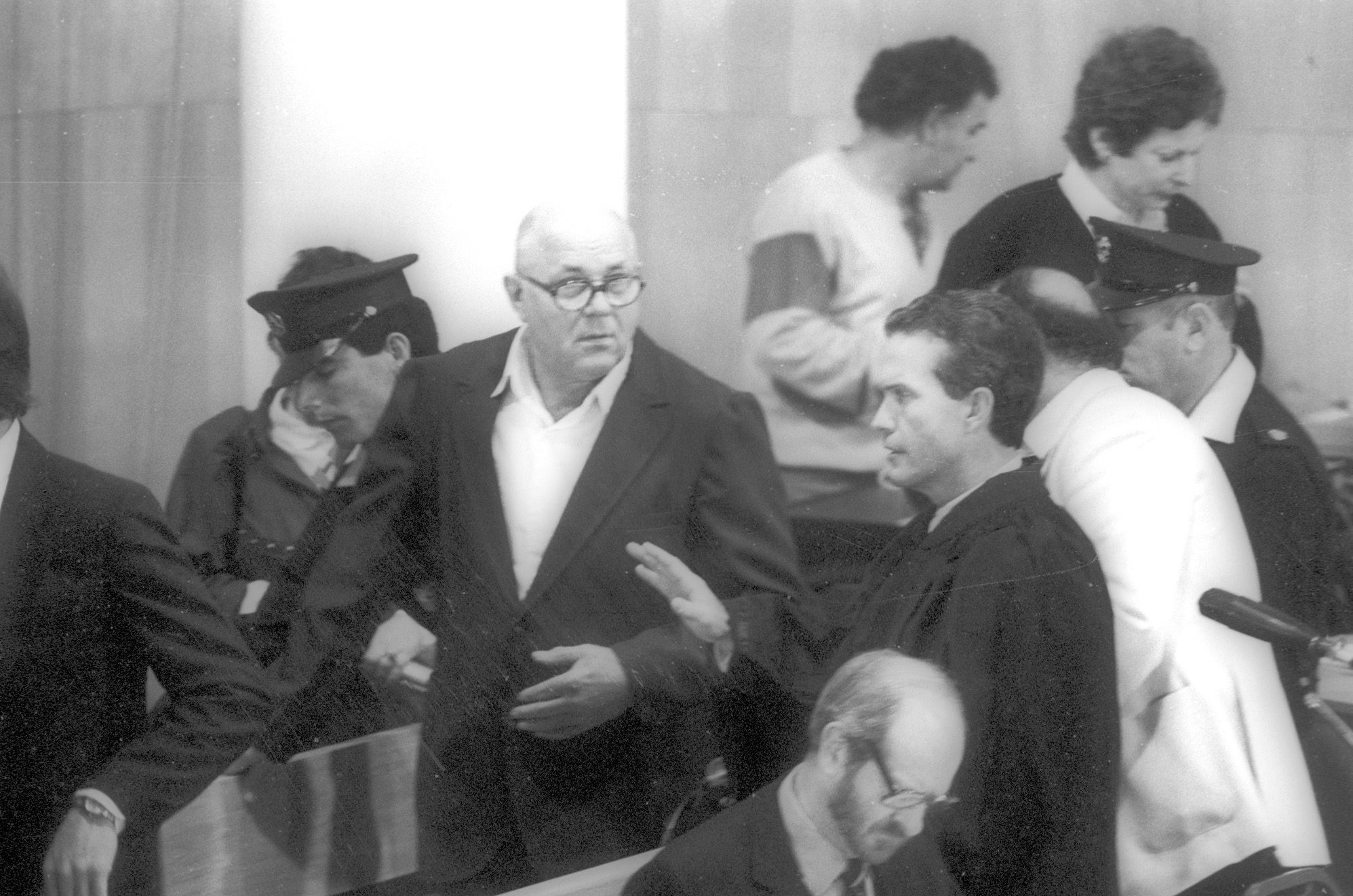
Demjanjuk speaking with his attorney Mark O'Connor on 16 February 1987

Demjanjuk was at first represented by attorney Mark J. O'Connor of New York State; Demjanjuk fired him in July 1987 just a week before he was scheduled to testify at his trial. In his place, Demjanjuk hired Israeli trial lawyer Yoram Sheftel whom O'Connor had hired as co-counsel. Sheftel focused the defense largely on the claim that Demjanjuk's Trawniki card was a KGB forgery. Most significantly, Sheftel called Dr. Julius Grant, who had proven that the Hitler diaries were forged. Grant testified that the document had been forged. He also called Dutch psychologist Willem Albert Wagenaar, who testified to flaws in the method by which Treblinka survivors had identified Demjanjuk as Ivan the Terrible. Additionally, Sheftel alleged that the trial was a show trial, and referred to the trial as "the Demjanjuk affair", alluding to the famous antisemitic Dreyfus Affair.

Demjanjuk testified during the trial that he was imprisoned in a camp in Chełm until 1944, when he was transferred to another camp in Austria, where he remained until he joined an anti-Soviet Ukrainian army group. Demjanjuk had not mentioned Chelm in his initial depositions in the United States, first referring to Chelm during his denaturalization trial in 1981. As Chelm was Demjanjuk's alibi, he was questioned about this omission during the trial by both the prosecutors and the judges; Demjanjuk blamed the trauma of his POW experience and said he had simply forgotten. Demjanjuk also denied having known how to drive a truck in 1943, despite having stated this on his application for refugee assistance in 1948; Demjanjuk alleged that he had not filled out the form himself and the clerk must have misunderstood him. Demjanjuk's denial related both to the supposed operation of a truck's diesel engine by "Ivan the Terrible" for the gas chamber at Treblinka and to the SS's singling out of Ukrainians with experience driving trucks as Trawniki men. Demjanjuk changed his testimony as to why he had listed Sobibor as his place of domicile from his earlier trials; he now claimed to have been advised to do so by an official of the United Nations Relief Administration to list a place in Poland or Czechoslovakia in order to avoid repatriation to the Soviet Union, after which another Soviet refugee waiting with him suggested Demjanjuk list Sobibor. Demjanjuk also said, "Your Honors, if I had really been in that terrible place, would I have been stupid enough to say so?"

Demjanjuk further claimed that in 1944 he was drafted into an anti-Soviet Russian military organization, the Russian Liberation Army (Vlasov Army), funded by the Nazi German government, until the surrender of Nazi Germany to the Allies in 1945. Following closing statements, the defense submitted the statement of Ignat Danilchenko, information which had been obtained through the US Freedom of Information but had not previously been made available to the defense by OSI. Danilchenko was a former guard at Sobibor and had been deposed by the Soviet Union in 1979 at the request of the OSI (US Office of Special Investigations). Danilchenko identified Demjanjuk from three separate photo spreads as having been an "experienced and reliable" guard at Sobibor and that Demjanjuk had been transferred to Flossenbürg, where he had received an SS blood-type tattoo; Danilchenko did not mention Treblinka. Through Baltic émigré supporters living in Washington, D.C., the defense was also able to acquire internal OSI notes that had been thrown in a dumpster without shredding that showed that Otto Horn had in fact had difficulty identifying Demjanjuk and had been prompted to make the identification.

=== Verdict and Israeli Supreme Court reversal ===
On 18 April 1988, the Jerusalem District Court found Demjanjuk "unhesitatingly and with utter conviction" guilty of all charges and of being "Ivan the Terrible". One week later, it sentenced him to death by hanging. Demjanjuk was placed in solitary confinement during the appeals process. While there, carpenters began building the gallows that would be used to hang him if his appeals were rejected, and Demjanjuk heard the construction from his cell.

On 29 July 1993, a five-judge panel of the Israeli Supreme Court overturned the guilty verdict on appeal. The Supreme Court upheld the lower court's rulings on the authenticity of the Trawniki card and the falsity of Demjanjuk's alibi but ruled that reasonable doubt existed that Demjanjuk was Ivan the Terrible. The judges agreed that Demjanjuk most likely served as a Nazi Wachmann (guard) in the Trawniki unit, and had been posted at Sobibor extermination camp and two other camps. Evidence to assist this claim included an identification card from Trawniki bearing Demjanjuk's picture and personal information, which was found in the Soviet archives, in addition to German documents that mentioned "Wachmann" Demjanjuk with his date and place of birth. The Trawniki certificate also implied that Demjanjuk had served at Sobibor, as did the German orders of March 1943 posting his Trawniki unit to the area. The court declined to find him guilty on this basis because the prosecution had built its entire case around Demjanjuk's identity with Ivan the Terrible, and Demjanjuk had not been given a chance to defend himself from charges of being a guard at Sobibor.

The judge's acquittal of Demjanjuk for being Ivan the Terrible was based on the written statements of 37 former guards at Treblinka that identified Ivan the Terrible as "Ivan Marchenko". The former guards' statements were obtained after World War II by the Soviets, who prosecuted USSR citizens who had assisted the Nazis as auxiliary forces during the war. Most of the guards were executed after the war by the Soviets, and their written statements were not obtained by Israeli authorities until 1991, when the Soviet Union collapsed. Central to the new evidence was a photograph of Ivan the Terrible and a description that did not match the 1942 appearance of Demjanjuk. The accounts of 21 guards who were tried in the Soviet Union on war crimes gave details that differentiate Demjanjuk from Ivan the Terrible— in particular that the surname of "Ivan the Terrible" was Marchenko, not Demjanjuk. One described Ivan the Terrible as having brown hair, hazel eyes and a large scar down to his neck; Demjanjuk was blond with grayish-blue eyes and no such scar. US officials had originally been aware, without informing Demjanjuk's attorneys, of the testimony of two of these German guards; however, the Israeli justices observed that Demjanjuk had incorrectly listed his mother's maiden name as Marchenko in his 1951 application for US visa. Demjanjuk said he just wrote a common Ukrainian surname after he forgot his mother's real name (Tabachyk).

=== Post-acquittal ===
Demjanjuk's acquittal was met with outrage in Israel, including threats against the justices' lives. Simon Wiesenthal, an iconic figure in Nazi-hunting, first believed Demjanjuk was guilty; after Demjanjuk's acquittal by the Israeli Supreme Court, he said he also would have cleared him given the new evidence. In Ukraine, Demjanjuk was viewed as a national hero and received a personal invitation to return to Ukraine by then-president Leonid Kravchuk. After Demjanjuk's acquittal, the Israeli Attorney General decided to release him rather than to pursue charges of committing crimes at Sobibor. Ten petitions against the decision were made to the Supreme Court. On 18 August 1993, the court rejected the petitions on the grounds that

1. the principle of double jeopardy would be infringed,
2. new charges would be unreasonable given the seriousness of those of which he had been acquitted,
3. conviction on the new charges would be unlikely, and
4. Demjanjuk was extradited from the United States specifically to stand trial for offenses attributed to Ivan the Terrible of Treblinka, and not for other alternative charges.

During the trial, the prosecution argued that Demjanjuk should be tried for crimes at Sobibor. However, Justice Aharon Barak was not convinced, stating, "We know nothing about him at Sobibor." Demjanjuk was released to return to the United States. His return was met by protests and counter-protests, with supporters including members of the Ku Klux Klan. Even before his acquittal by the Israeli Supreme Court, the US Sixth Circuit Court of Appeals had opened an investigation into whether OSI had withheld evidence from the defense. The investigation charged that OSI had ignored evidence indicating that Demjanjuk was not Ivan the Terrible, and uncovered an internal OSI memo that questioned the case against Demjanjuk. After Demjanjuk's acquittal in Israel, the panel of judges on the Sixth Circuit ruled against OSI for having committed fraud on the court and having failed to provide exculpatory evidence to Demjanjuk's defense.

== Second loss of US citizenship and extradition to Germany ==
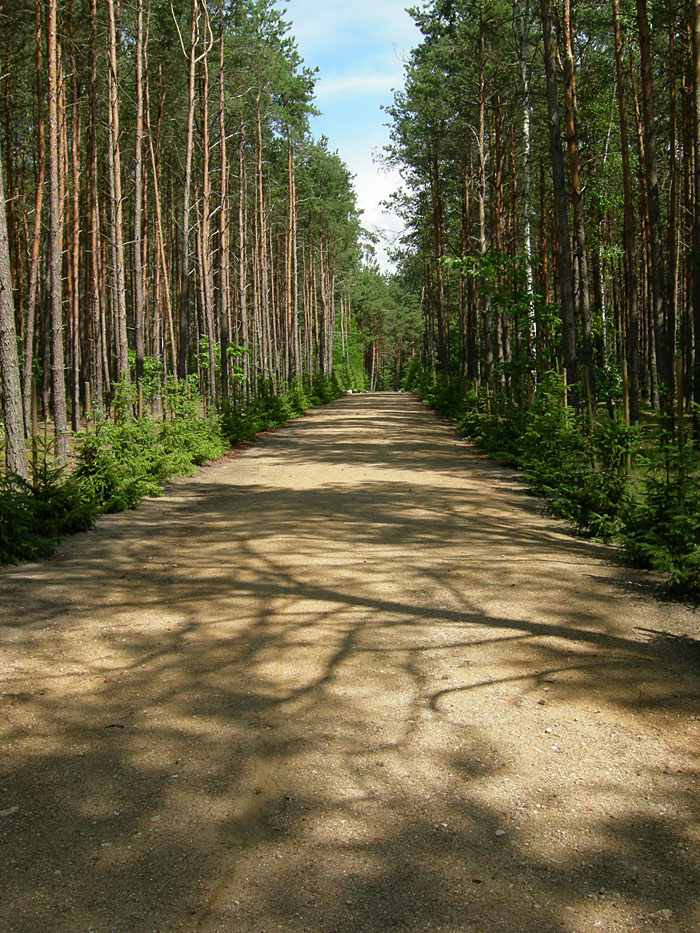
Sobibor "Road to Death" in 2007

On 20 February 1998, Judge Paul Matia of the US District Court for the Northern District of Ohio vacated Demjanjuk's denaturalization "without prejudice," meaning that OSI could seek to strip Demjanjuk of citizenship a second time. OSI continued to investigate Demjanjuk, relying solely on documentary evidence rather than eye-witnesses. These documents were found in former Soviet archives in Moscow and in Lithuania, which placed Demjanjuk at Sobibor on 26 March 1943, at Flossenbürg on 1 October 1943, and at Majdanek from November 1942 through early March 1943; administrative documents from Flossenbürg referencing Demjanjuk's name and Trawniki card number were also uncovered. On 19 May 1999, the Justice Department filed a complaint against Demjanjuk to seek his denaturalization. The complaint alleged that Demjanjuk served as a guard at the Sobibór and Majdanek camps in Poland under German occupation and as a member of an SS death's head battalion at Flossenbürg. The complaint relied on evidence compiled by historians Charles W. Sydnor Jr. and Todd Huebner, who compared Demjanjuk's Trawniki card to 40 other known cards and found that issues on the card that had fueled suspicions of fraud were in fact typical of Trawniki's poor record keeping.

In February 2002, Judge Matia revoked Demjanjuk's US citizenship. Matia ruled that Demjanjuk had not produced any credible evidence of his whereabouts during the war and that the Justice Department had proved its case against him. Demjanjuk appealed to the US Court of Appeals for the Sixth Circuit, which on 30 April 2004 ruled that Demjanjuk could be again stripped of his US citizenship because the Justice Department had presented "clear, unequivocal and convincing evidence" of Demjanjuk's service in Nazi death camps. The United States Supreme Court declined to hear his appeal in November 2004.

On 28 December 2005, an immigration judge ordered Demjanjuk deported to Germany, Poland or Ukraine. In an attempt to avoid deportation, Demjanjuk sought protection under the United Nations Convention against Torture, claiming that he would be prosecuted and tortured if he were deported to Ukraine. Chief US Immigration Judge Michael Creppy ruled there was no evidence to substantiate Demjanjuk's claim that he would be mistreated if he were sent to Ukraine. On 22 December 2006, the Board of Immigration Appeals upheld the deportation order. On 30 January 2008, the US Court of Appeals for the Sixth Circuit denied Demjanjuk's request for review. On 19 May 2008, the US Supreme Court denied Demjanjuk's petition for certiorari, declining to hear his case against the deportation order. The Supreme Court's denial of review meant that the order of removal was final; no other appeal was possible.

One month after the US Supreme Court's refusal to hear Demjanjuk's case, on 19 June 2008, Germany announced it would seek the extradition of Demjanjuk to Germany. The file on Demjanjuk was compiled by Germany's Central Office for the Investigation of National Socialist Crimes. On 10 November 2008, German federal prosecutor Kurt Schrimm directed prosecutors to file in Munich for extradition, since Demjanjuk once lived there. On 9 December 2008, a German federal court declared that Demjanjuk could be tried for his role in the Holocaust. Some three months later, on 11 March 2009, Demjanjuk was charged with more than 29,000 counts of accessory to murder of Jewish prisoners at the Sobibor extermination camp. The German foreign ministry announced on 2 April 2009 that Demjanjuk would be transferred to Germany the following week, and would face trial beginning 30 November 2009.

On 2 April 2009, Demjanjuk filed a motion in an immigration trial court in Virginia. The motion sought to reopen the matter of the removal order against him; that order of removal had been originally issued by an immigration court in 2005, had been upheld by the BIA on administrative appeal in late 2006, and was further upheld by the Sixth Circuit Court of Appeals; after these two appeals, the US Supreme Court had, as noted above, denied any review. On 3 April 2009, US Immigration Judge Wayne Iskra temporarily stayed Demjanjuk's deportation; Iskrka reversed himself on 6 April. As the US government noted, a motion to reopen, such as Demjanjuk's, could only properly be filed with the Board of Immigration Appeals (BIA) in Washington, D.C., and not an immigration trial court. The issuance of the stay by the immigration trial court was therefore improper, as that court had no jurisdiction over the matter. Accordingly, Demjanjuk re-filed his motion to reopen, and for an attendant stay, with the BIA. On 10 April, the BIA found there was "little likelihood of success that [Demjanjuk's] pending motion to re-open the case will be granted" and accordingly denied his motion for a stay pending the disposition of his motion to reopen. This removed any obstacles to federal agents seizing him for deportation to Germany.

On 14 April 2009, immigration agents removed Demjanjuk from his home in preparation for deportation. The same day, Demjanjuk's son filed a motion in the US Court of Appeals for the Sixth Circuit asking that the deportation be stayed, which was subsequently granted. The US government argued that the Court of Appeals has no jurisdiction to review the decision of the Board of Immigration Appeals, which denied the stay. Demjanjuk later won a last-minute stay of deportation, shortly after US immigration agents carried him from his home in a wheelchair to face trial in Germany. The BIA denied Demjanjuk's motion to reopen his deportation case. On 1 May 2009, the Sixth Circuit lifted the stay that it had imposed against Demjanjuk's deportation order. On 7 May 2009, the US Supreme Court, via Justice John Paul Stevens, declined to consider Demjanjuk's case for review, thereby denying Demjanjuk any further stay of deportation. Demjanjuk had sued Germany on 30 April 2009 to try to block the German government's agreement to accept Demjanjuk from the US. The German Administrative Court rejected Demjanjuk's claim on 6 May. Demjanjuk was deported to Germany, leaving Cleveland, Ohio, on 11 May, to arrive in Munich on 12 May. Upon his arrival, he was arrested and sent to Munich's Stadelheim prison.

== Trial in Germany ==
On 3 July 2009, prosecutors deemed Demjanjuk fit to stand trial. On 13 July 2009, prosecutors charged him with 27,900 counts of accessory to murder for his time as a guard at Sobibor. Demjanjuk was tried without any connection to a concrete act of murder or cruelty but rather on the theory that as a guard at Sobibor he was per se guilty of murder, a novelty in the German justice system that was seen as risky for the prosecution. Some 35 plaintiffs were admitted to file in the case, including four survivors of the Sobibor concentration camp and 26 relatives of victims. The indictment made almost no mention of Demjanjuk's service at Majdanek or Flossenbürg, as these were not extermination camps.

Demjanjuk was represented by German attorneys Ulrich Busch and Günther Maul. The defense argued that Demjanjuk had never been a guard but that, had he been one, he would have had no choice in the matter. Busch alleged that the German justice system was prejudiced against his client, and that the entire trial was therefore illegitimate. Busch also alleged that the trial violated the principle of double jeopardy due to the previous trial in Israel. According to Munich state prosecutor Anton Winkler, doctors restricted the time Demjanjuk could be tried in court each day to two sessions of 90 minutes each. On 30 November 2009, Demjanjuk's trial, expected to last for several months, began in Munich. Demjanjuk arrived in the courtroom in a wheelchair pushed by a German police officer. Because of the long pauses between trial dates and cancellations caused by the alleged health problems of the defendant and his defense attorney Busch's use of many legal motions, the trial eventually stretched to eighteen months.

On 14 April 2010, Anton Dallmeyer, an expert witness, testified that the typeset and handwriting on an ID card being used as key evidence matched four other ID cards believed to have been issued at the SS training camp at Trawniki. Demjanjuk's lawyer argued that all of the ID cards could be forgeries and that there was no point comparing them. The prosecution also produced orders to a man identified as Demjanjuk to go to Sobibor and other records to show that Demjanjuk had served as a guard there. Demjanjuk's defense team argued that these documents were Soviet forgeries. As part of the prosecution's case, historian Dieter Pohl of the University of Klagenfurt testified that Sobibor was a death camp, the sole purpose of which was the killing of Jews, and that all Trawniki men had been generalists involved in guarding the prisoners as well as other duties; therefore, if Demjanjuk was a Trawniki man at Sobibor, he had necessarily been involved in sending the prisoners to their deaths and was an accessory to murder. The prosecution further argued, using Pohl's testimony, firstly that Demjanjuk's choice after being captured by the Germans was guard duty or forced labor, not death, secondly that the Trawniki guards were a privileged group that was essential to the Holocaust, and finally that Demjanjuk's failure to desert, something many Trawniki guards did, showed that he had been at Sobibor voluntarily.

On 24 February 2010, a witness for the prosecution, Alex Nagorny, who agreed to serve the Nazi Germans after his capture, testified that he knew Demjanjuk from his time as a guard. When asked to identify Demjanjuk in the courtroom, Nagorny was unable to, stating: "That's definitely not him – no resemblance." As Nagorny had previously identified Demjanjuk from his US visa application photo, his inability to recognize Demjanjuk in the courtroom was seen as incongruous. Demjanjuk declined to testify or make a final statement during the trial; however, he delivered three written declarations to the court that alleged that his prosecution was caused by a conspiracy between the OSI, the World Jewish Congress, and the Simon Wiesenthal Center, while continuing to allege that the KGB had forged the documents used. In his third declaration, Demjanjuk demanded access to a secret KGB file numbered 1627 and declared a hunger strike until he got it.

On 15 January 2011, Spain requested a European arrest warrant be issued for Nazi war crimes against Spaniards; the request was refused for a lack of evidence. On 12 May 2011, aged 91, Demjanjuk was convicted as an accessory to the murder of 28,060 Jews at Sobibor killing center and sentenced to five years in prison with two years already served. Presiding Judge Ralph Alt ordered Demjanjuk released from custody pending his appeal, as he did not appear to pose a flight-risk. This was the first time someone has been convicted by a German court solely on the basis of serving as a camp guard, with no evidence of being involved in the death of any specific inmate. His release pending appeal was protested by some, including Efraim Zuroff of the Simon Wiesenthal Center.

As Demjanjuk was stateless and lacked financial means, he was unable to leave Germany. The day of his conviction, municipal authorities from Munich placed Demjanjuk in the St. Lukas nursing home in Bad Feilnbach, a spa town south of the city. The decision was justified since Demjanjuk was considered in need of stationary care, though not previously discussed with the town's mayor. Demjanjuk's presence became public through a Bild article on 23 May 2011, which resulted in some immediate cancellations at local hotels in Bad Feilnbach and e-mails by regular guests, some of whom vowed to never return to Bad Feilnbach in protest. Overall tourism was not affected and as Demjanjuk was set to remain within the nursing facility, no efforts were made by the town to relocate him.

== Death and posthumous efforts to restore US citizenship ==
John Demjanjuk died at the nursing home in Bad Feilnbach on 17 March 2012, aged 91. As a consequence of his appeal not having been heard, Demjanjuk is still presumed innocent under German law. In early June 2012, Ulrich Busch, Demjanjuk's attorney, filed a complaint with Bavarian prosecutors claiming that the pain medication Novalgin (known in the US as metamizole or dipyrone) that had been administered to Demjanjuk helped lead to his death. The investigation was closed in November 2012 after no evidence emerged to support the allegations.

Following his death, his relatives requested that he be buried in the United States, where he once lived. Jewish organizations have opposed this, claiming that his burial site would become a center for neo-Nazi activity. On 31 March 2012, it was reported that Demjanjuk was buried at an undisclosed US location. On 12 April 2012, Demjanjuk's attorneys filed a suit to posthumously restore his US citizenship. On 28 June 2012, the 6th US Circuit Court of Appeals in Cincinnati ruled that Demjanjuk could not regain his citizenship posthumously. On 11 September 2012, the court denied Demjanjuk's request to have the appeal reheard en banc by the full court.

== Legacy ==
The 1989 film Music Box, directed by Costa-Gavras, is based in part on the Demjanjuk case. Author Philip Roth, who briefly attended the Demjanjuk trial in Israel, portrays a fictionalized version of Demjanjuk and his trial in the 1993 novel Operation Shylock. In 2019, Netflix released The Devil Next Door, a documentary by Israeli filmmakers Daniel Sivan and Yossi Bloch that focuses on Demjanjuk's trial in Israel.

=== Subsequent prosecutions of Nazi extermination camp guards in Germany ===
Demjanjuk's conviction for accessory to murder solely on the basis of having been a guard at a concentration camp set a new legal precedent in Germany. Prior to Demjanjuk's trial, the requirement that prosecutors find a specific act of murder to charge guards with had resulted in a very low conviction rate for death camp guards. Following Demjanjuk's conviction, however, Germany began aggressively prosecuting former death camp guards. In 2015, former Auschwitz guard Oskar Gröning was convicted on the same legal argument as Demjanjuk; his conviction was upheld on appeal, solidifying the precedent made by the Demjanjuk case. In 2019, German prosecutors charged guards at a concentration camp—as opposed to a death camp—on the same rationale for the first time: former Stutthof concentration camp guards Johann Rehbogen and Bruno Dey.

=== Publication of photographs from Sobibor ===
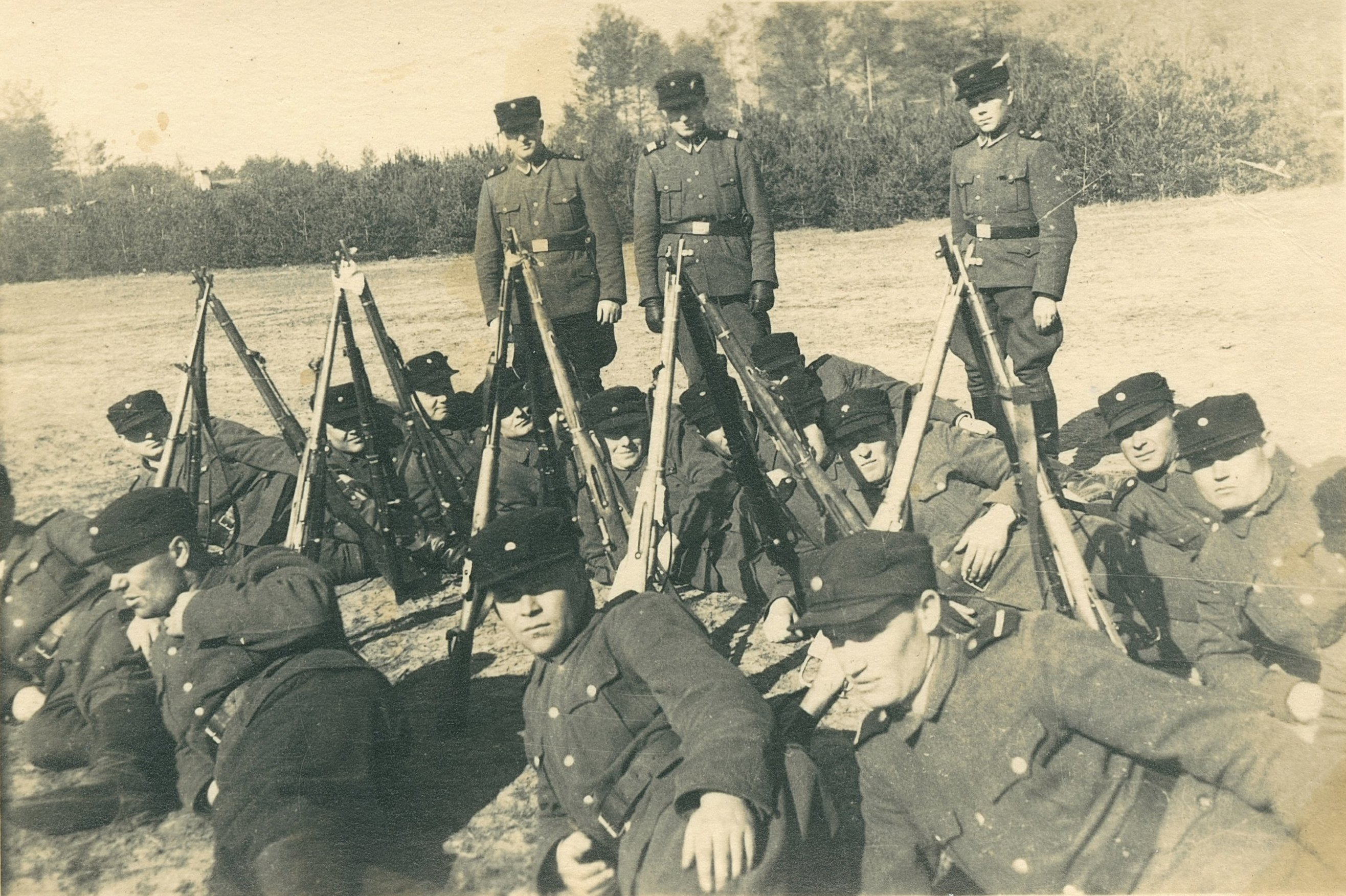
Photograph of Trawniki guards at Sobibor, taken in 1943. This was not seen publicly until January 2020, when it was one of numerous photos from Sobibor newly exhibited in Berlin. The originals have been donated to the US Holocaust Memorial Museum. Demjanjuk was "inconclusively identified" as the guard in the middle of the front row.

In January 2020, the Topography of Terror Foundation in Berlin announced that they were about to exhibit and publish a collection of 361 photographs taken by Johann Niemann over the course of his career, including from his time as deputy commandant of Sobibor, which had been made newly available by his descendants. They believe the collection includes two photos showing Demjanjuk with fellow guards at the camp, which would be the first documentary evidence to conclusively establish he had served there.

On 20 January 2020, the day after the announcement, the Ludwigsburg Research Center qualified it by saying it is likely that one of the men in the noted photos is Demjanjuk but that this cannot be said "with absolute certainty" ("mit absoluter Gewissheit"), given the time that had passed since they were taken. Niemann was killed there on 14 October 1943 during a prisoner revolt. The photographs were published on 28 January 2020 in the book Fotos aus Sobibor ("Photos from Sobibor"). The Niemann family has donated the originals to the collection of the United States Holocaust Memorial Museum, which has digitized this collection for research.

== See also ==
- List of denaturalized former citizens of the United States
- List of most-wanted Nazi war criminals
- Andrija Artuković
- Johann Breyer
- Algimantas Dailidė
- Yaroslav Hunka scandal
- Bohdan Koziy
- Erich Lachmann
- Karl Linnas
- Arthur Rudolph

== Bibliography ==
- Kudryashov, Sergei (2004). "Ordinary Collaborators: The Case of the Travniki Guards". In Erickson, Mark; Erickson, Ljubica (eds.). Russia War, Peace and Diplomacy Essays in Honour of John Erickson. London: Weidenfeld & Nicolson. pp. 226–239. ISBN 978-0-297-84913-1 – via Google Books.
- Douglas, Lawrence (2016). The Right Wrong Man: John Demjanjuk and the Last Great Nazi War Crimes Trial. Princeton University Press. ISBN 978-0-691-17825-7 – via Google Books.
- Rashke, Richard (2013). Useful Enemies: John Demjanjuk and America's Open-Door Policy for Nazi War Criminals. Delphinium Books. ISBN 978-1480401594 – via Google Books.
- Wagenaar, Willem Albert (1988). Identifying Ivan: A Case Study in Legal Psychology. Cambridge, Massachusetts: Harvard University Press. ISBN 978-0-674-44285-6 – via Google Books.
