= Dov Levin =

Israeli Supreme Court justice (1925–2001)

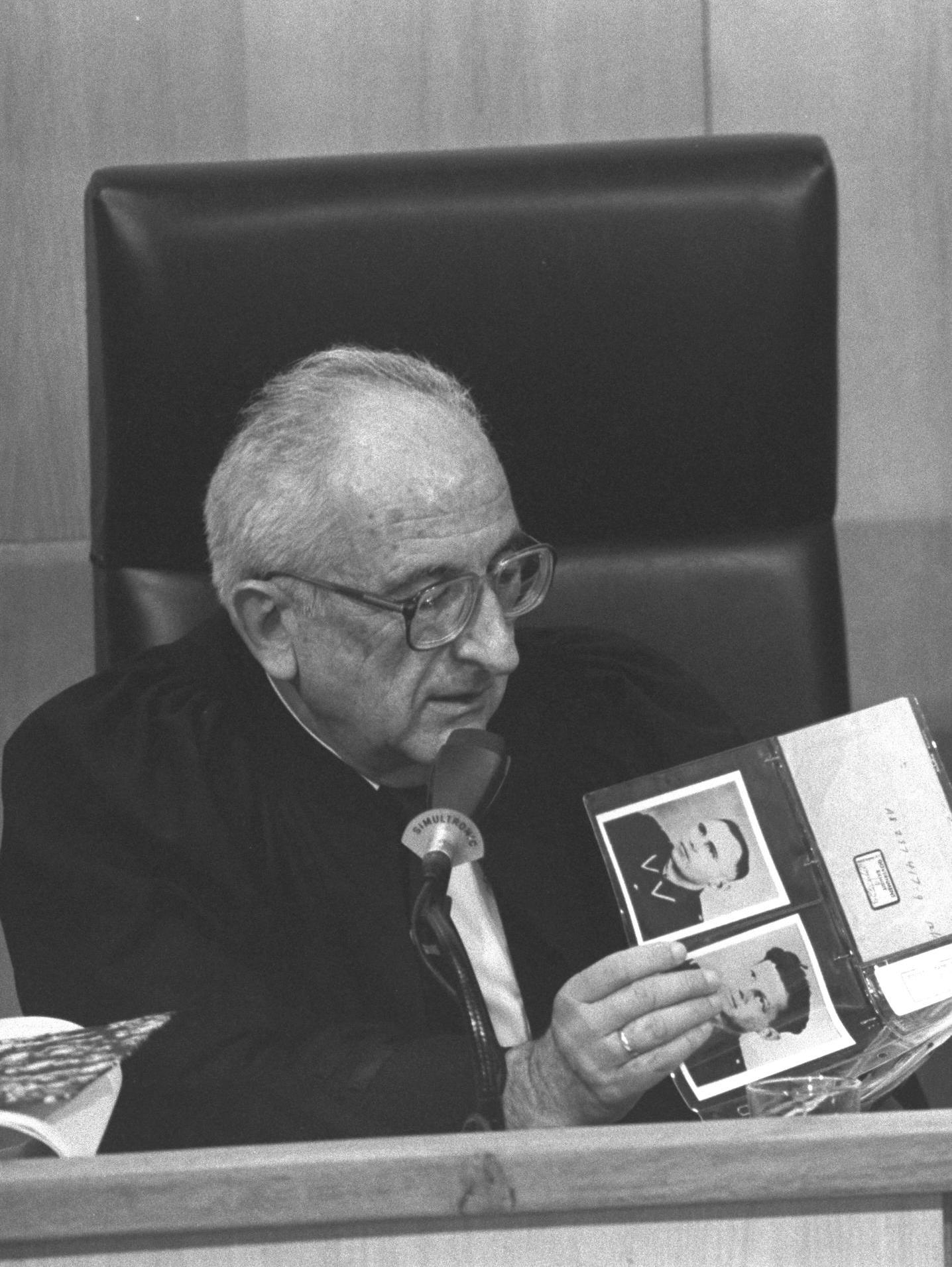
Dov Levin (1988)

Dov Levin (Hebrew: דב לוין; December 1, 1925 – June 27 or 28, 2001) was an Israeli jurist in the Supreme Court justice in 1982–1995. He served, most notably as one of the judges in the trial of John Demjanjuk.

== Biography ==
Dov Levin was born in Tel Aviv to Eliyahu and Dvora Levin. His father was born in Russia and immigrated to Palestine with his family as a child, and his mother was born in Palestine to a family of rabbis and scholars, descendants of the Vilna Gaon and residents of Palestine since the mid-19th century.

In 1943, Levin moved to Jerusalem. He joined the Irgun while at the same time working at the headquarters of the Palestine Police Force. He also went to law school, and continued studying law upon his return to Tel Aviv in 1945. During the 1948 Arab–Israeli War he served in the Israel Defense Forces as an officer in the Alexandroni Brigade's 35th Battalion. In the reserves, he served in the Adjutant Corps.

Levin had two sons, Eliyahu and Assaf, both of them lawyers. He was also the uncle of poet and translator Amasai Levin.

== Legal career ==
In 1951 Dov Levin joined the Israel Bar Association. In September 1966, he became a judge. He also served in that capacity in the Military Court of Appeals as part of his reserve service. Levin presided as a judge in the Tel Aviv magistrate court until May 1972, when he was promoted to the district court. In 1979 he became vice-president of the court. In March 1981, he became a provisional Supreme Court justice and was given a permanent tenure on February 15, 1982. In 1988, he presided over a special court that judged John Demjanjuk and in the same year was responsible for disqualifying the Kach party from running for the Knesset.

Levin was head of the National Council for Prevention of Road Accidents and the Israel Football Association refereeing departments. After retiring from the bench in 1995, he became an arbitrator.

== Awards and recognition ==
In 1997, Levin received the Yakir Tel Aviv prize.
