= Bad Feilnbach =

- Municipality
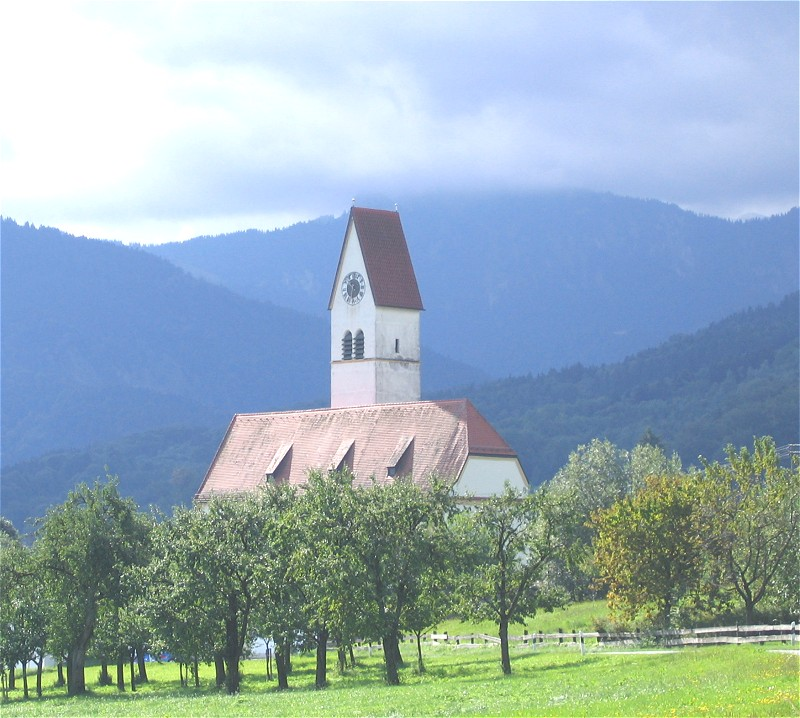
- Church in the village of Lippertskirchen, part of Bad Feilnbach municipality

- Coat of arms

- Location of Bad Feilnbach within Rosenheim district
- Interactive map of Bad Feilnbach
- Location within Germany Location within Bavaria
- Coordinates: 47°47′N 12°1′E
- Country: Germany
- State: Bavaria
- Admin. region: Oberbayern
- District: Rosenheim

Government
  - Mayor (2024–30): Max Singer

Area
  - Total: 57.49 km^{2} (22.20 sq mi)
- Elevation: 512 m (1,680 ft)

Population (2025-12-31)
  - Total: 8,245
  - Density: 143.4/km^{2} (371.4/sq mi)
- Time zone: UTC+01:00 (CET)
  - Summer (DST): UTC+02:00 (CEST)
- Postal codes: 83075
- Dialling codes: 08066, 08064 (Au b. Bad Aibling)
- Vehicle registration: RO
- Website: Bad Feilnbach

Bad Feilnbach (German pronunciation: [baːt ˈfaɪlnbax]) is a municipality in the Upper Bavarian district of Rosenheim at the foot of the Wendelstein in Germany. As a famous 'Moorheilbad' (moor healing spa) the municipality was awarded in 1973 the title "Bad". Since the 19th century the peat deposits were the basis for a continued expansion of the spa and health facilities. The recognized healing success of "black gold" on a variety of diseases were the basis for the development of a well-known spa and tourist community. Due to its wooded surroundings and the mild climate Feilnbach is called the "Bavarian Meran". The entire municipality is recognized as a healing spa resort except for parts of the former municipality Dettendorf.

== Geography ==
Bad Feilnbach is located directly on the northern edge of the Bavarian Alps, at the foot of the 1,838 m high Wendelstein. The village is located 17 km east of Miesbach, 10 km south of Bad Aibling, 15 km southwest of Rosenheim and 33 km from Kufstein. The Autobahn A8 (junction Bad Aibling) is 5 km away, German federal highway B93 (exit Reischenhart) 9 km, and the nearest railway stations in Bad Aibling and Raubling are 10 km.

=== Constituent communities ===
The municipality Bad Feilnbach has 77 officially designated districts:

77 Designated Districts
- Achthal
- Aich
- Aign
- Altenburg
- Altofing
- Au bei Bad Aibling
- Bad Feilnbach
- Berg
- Berghalde
- Bichl
- Bindham
- Birkmann
- Blindenried
- Brainpold
- Brettschleipfen
- Brodhub
- Derndorf
- Dettendorf
- Eckersberg
- Eulenau
- Eulenthal
- Forsting
- Gern
- Gottschalling
- Gries
- Gundelsberg
- Gunzlloh
- Hausstatt
- Hof
- Hoferalm
- Hoiß
- Hummelhausen
- Jenbach
- Kematen
- Kogl
- Kreuzhub
- Kronwitt
- Kutterling
- Lengendorf
- Lippertskirchen
- Litzldorf
- Moos
- Moosbichl
- Mooshäusl
- Moosmühle
- Oberbindham
- Oberdaxham
- Oberhofen
- Oberlengendorf
- Oberlohe
- Oberpremrain
- Obersteinach
- Paulreuth
- Pfaffenberg
- Rabenstein
- Rann
- Reithof
- Schweigfeld
- Sonnenham
- Steinreb
- Steinwies
- Thalham
- Torfwerk Au-Eulenau
- Torfwerk Feilnbach
- Trogen
- Unterhofen
- Unterkalten
- Unterlohe
- Untermoosbichl
- Unterpremrain
- Untersteinach
- Walch
- Weidach
- Tregleralm
- Weihermann
- Wiechs
- Wilharting

== History ==
Feilnbach became an independent municipality in 1818, following administrative reform in Bavaria.

From 27 May 1897 until 1973 Feilnbach was at the end of the local railway Bad Aibling-Feilnbach.

On 1 January 1966, the municipalities Feilnbach and Wiechs were merged to form the new community Feilnbach-Wiechs whose name was changed on 28 December 1971 in Feilnbach. Following municipal reform, on 1 January 1972 Au bei Bad Aibling was incorporated into the municipality. Dettendorf followed on 1 February 1972. On October 22, 1973, the community received the additional title Bad (bath). Finally, the community Litzldorf was incorporated into Bad Feilnbach on May 1, 1978.

On July 1, 1972, Bad Feilnbach, which was previously part of the district of Bad Aibling, was made part of the Rosenheim district.

The individual settlements were probably formed in Roman times and Feilnbach is first mentioned in 980 as "Fulinpah", which is derived from the name for a sluggish or slow flowing brook (Bach). The municipality extends from the foothills of Wendelstein far into the moorland of Rosenheim Basin, covering approximately 5,800 ha.

=== Crest History ===
The silver wave bar is a symbol of Bach (brook) and represents the main town Feilnbach, whose name was derived from "Faulenbach" (Fulinpah). The Silver Church was originally taken from the coat of arms of the nobles of Diepertskirchen. These gentlemen held the seat in Lippertskirchen from the beginning of the 11th to the late 15th century. The coat of arms was adopted in 1957 by Feilnbach and amended in 1966. In 1973 the town was awarded the title "Bad" and since then bears the name of Bad Feilnbach. Thus the place underlines its importance as a mud spa and natural healing village. (See. House of Bavarian History)

=== Population development (at December 31) ===
Historical population

Year	Pop.	±% p.a.
2001	7,096	—
2002	7,205	+1.54%
2003	7,203	−0.03%
2004	7,187	−0.22%
2005	7,224	+0.51%
2006	7,262	+0.53%
2007	7,359	+1.34%

Year	Pop.	±% p.a.
2008	7,435	+1.03%
2009	7,450	+0.20%
2010	7,535	+1.14%
2011	7,597	+0.82%
2012	7,749	+2.00%
2013	7,734	−0.19%

Source: Municipality Bad Feilnbach

== Business, tourism and infrastructure ==
Several large spa and rehabilitation facilities are located in Bad Feilnbach. The treatments in these facilities are based on "Badetorf" traditional spa therapy. As the town of Bad Feilnbach has been a recognised Spa since 1973, several alternative healing method 'bathing' doctors and medical practitioners have settled in Bad Feilnbach. (TCM, homeopathy, herbal medicine, Ayurveda, Naturopathy...). The 4 star Bad Feilnbach Imperial Camping Outdoor Resort, with 800 parking spaces, is an integral part of the tourist offer of Bad Feilnbach since 1968.

=== Education and social services ===
- Primary and Secondary School Bad Feilnbach
- Elementary School Au
- four municipal nursery schools and two Catholic kindergartens
- Nursing home St. Martin
- Nursing, therapy and wellness center St. Luke
- Ecumenical Nachbarschaftshilfe Bad Feilnbach eV
- German religious rehabilitation center

=== Public institutions ===
- Municipality with spa and guest information
- Travel service the spa and guest information
- Volkshochschule Bad Feilnbach
- Swimming pool in Bad Feilnbach (heated)
- Swimming in Au
- Adventure playground "Burgaltendorf Waldeck" in Au
- Adventure playground "Alter Bahnhof" in Bad Feilnbach
- Religious and communal library

=== Spa and Health ===
- There are several spa and rehabilitation clinics and health clinics in the city:
- Clinic + more Reithofpark
- Clinic + more Blumenhof
- Outpatient therapy center Bad Feilnbach

=== Nature experiences and leisure experience facilities ===
- Jenbachtal and Jenbachwasserfälle
- Nature reserve Auer Weitenmoos
- Moorerlebnis station "Sterntaler felts"
- Theme "On Traces of God"
- Water experience "Jenbachparadies"
- Horses Region Upper Bavaria / Tyrol with remote bridleways
- Industrial monument "Old cement plant" in Litzldorf
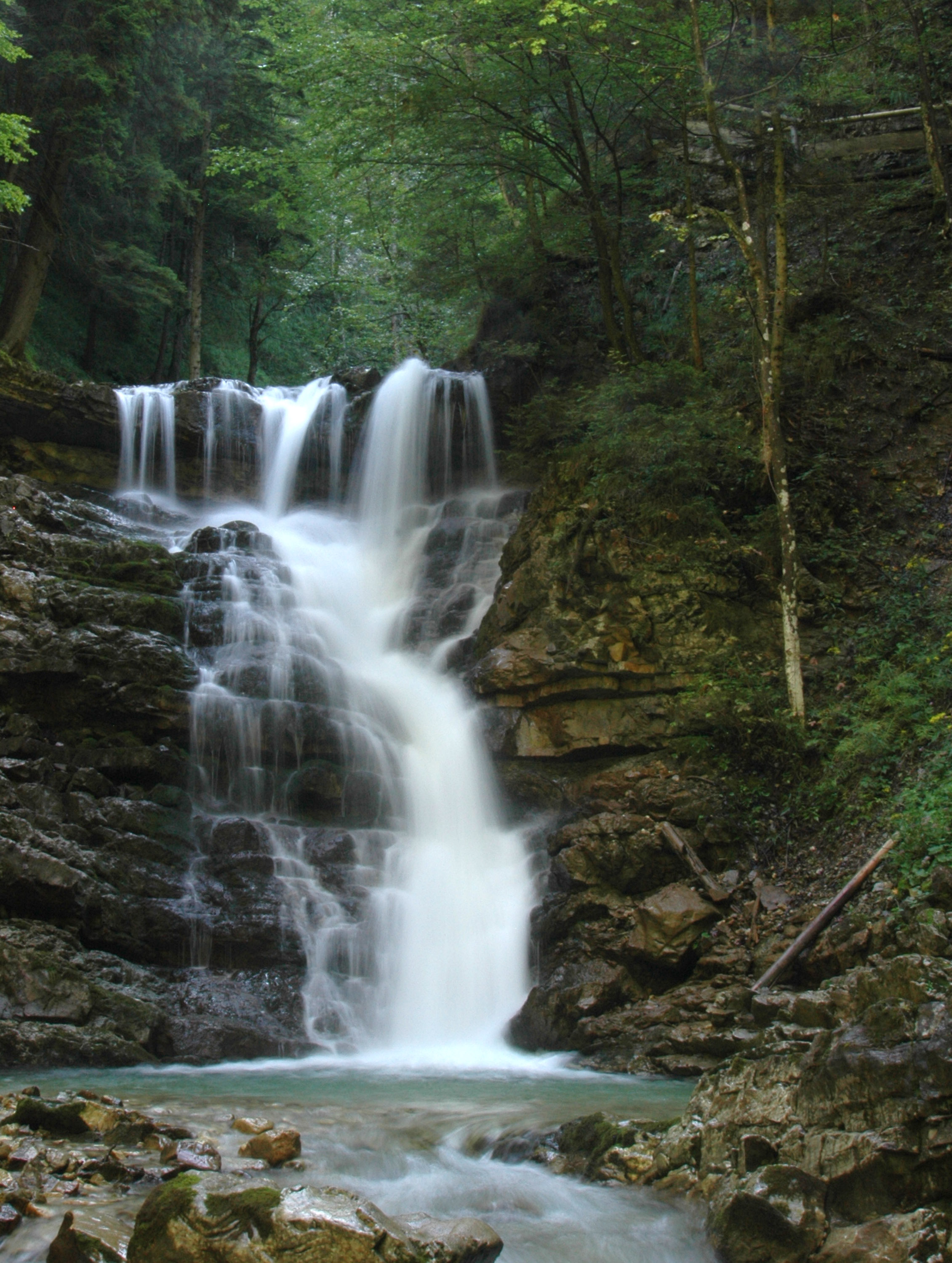
Jenbach waterfall

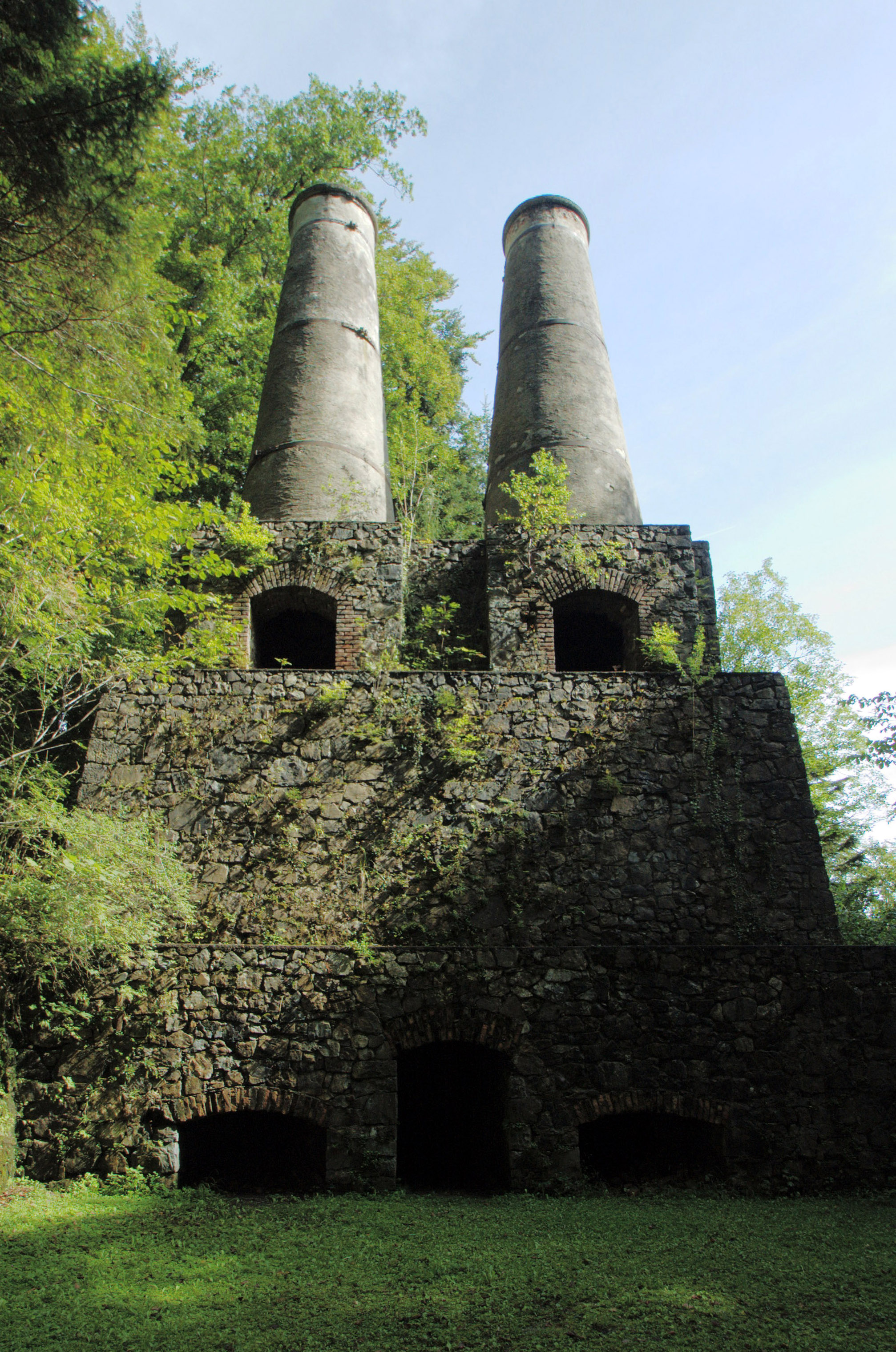
Historic cement works

=== Parks ===
Bad Feilnbach has several "nature" parks in the municipal area and along the Jenbachtal. In the upper part of the Jenbachtal, an adventure trail, the "Jenbachwasser", follows the waterfalls and cataracts from the upper car park and the mountain pastures in Jenbachtal to the outskirts of the town. Later the adventure trail leads to the nature park along the lower Jenbach. There is the theme "On Traces of God" and the water experience "Jenbachparadies" with the water playground. Next to the City Hall and "Haus des Gastes" is a small spa with pavilion for spa concerts and events as well as a natural pool. The theme trails "On Traces of God", the "Moorerlebnis Sterntaler felts" and the "Jenbachparadies" were all funded by the EU LEADER program.

== Politics ==
=== Council ===
Election of March 16, 2014 : Tenure from 1 May 2014 to 30 April 2020

- CSU : 10 seats
- SPD : 3 seats
- FW : 7 seats

=== Mayor ===
The Mayor of Bad Feilnbach is Max Singer (independent), elected in 2024.

== Sports ==
- SV Bad Feilnbach eV
- Tennis Club Bad Feilnbach eV
- SG Wendelstein eV (shooting club)
- Mini Golf Club Bad Feilnbach eV - 18 holes minigolf (concrete paths)
- ASV Au
- Au Ski Club eV
- EC Bad Feilnbach curling

== Regular events ==
- Weibamarkt (April and November)
- Wendelstein tour in Au (August)
- Rossererfest (third weekend in August)
- Baths run (September)
- Bavaria's largest apple market with Gewerbeschau three days (second Friday, Saturday and Sunday in October)
- Plum Festival (September 3 to Sunday, Aumanwirt, Altofing)
- Leonhardiritt in Lippert churches (first or second Sunday in November)
- Grama-Schupfenfest in Lengenfeld village, Koal Schupf, second weekend in June
- Moss Prost in Dette village, every year at Pentecost
- Night flea market and street fair of volunteer firefighters Bad Feilnbach (June)
- Chor des Bayerischen week Sängerbund
- Spa concerts and cultural evenings
- Sommerfest in the Natural Park (June)
- Christmas Market in the Natural Park (December)
- Christmas Cup / indoor tournament of the SV Bad Feilnbach

== Sons and daughters of the town ==
- Wolfgang Dientzenhofer (1648–1706), baroque architect
- Georg Dientzenhofer (1643–1689), baroque architect
- Abraham Millauer (around 1680-1758), architect, church builder
- Franz Xaver Gernstl (born 1951), filmmaker

== Bad Feilnbacher churches ==
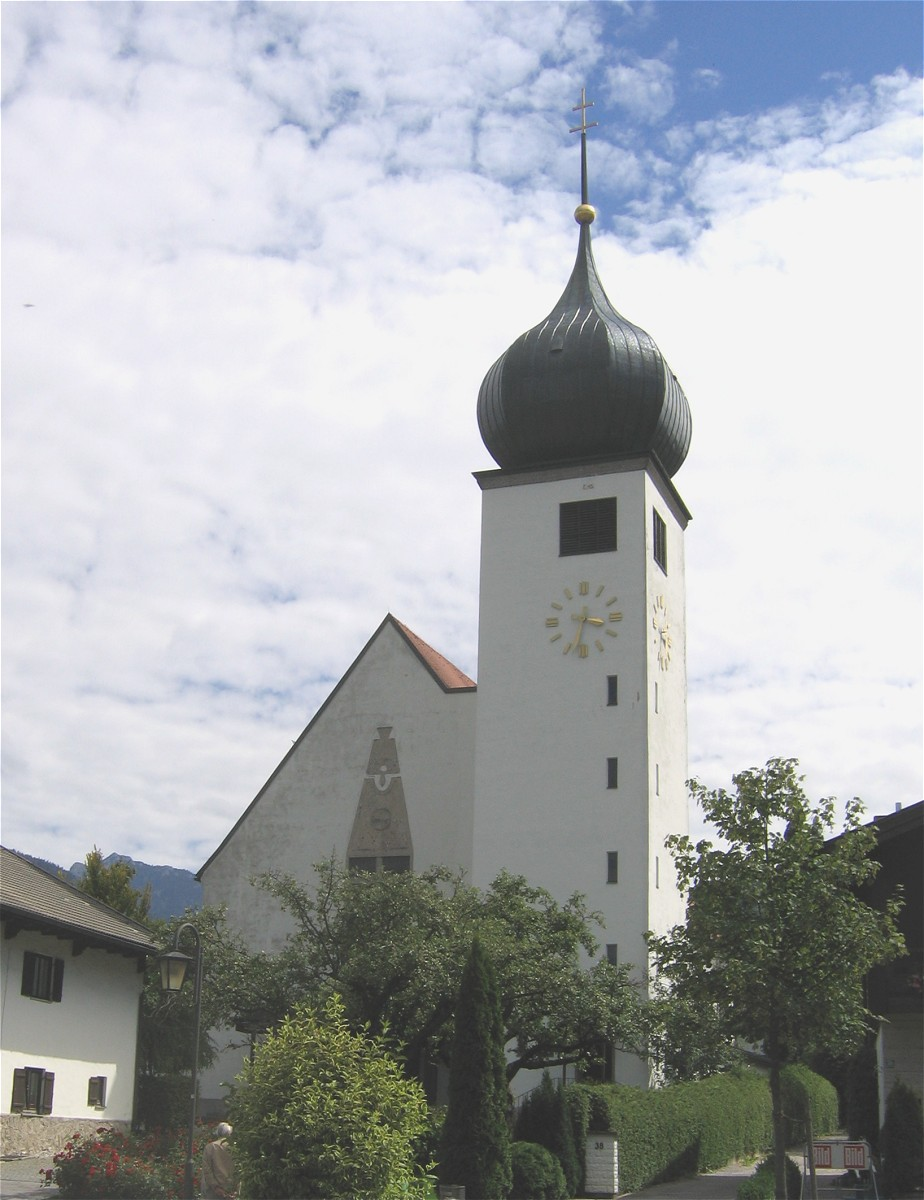
Kirche in Bad Feilnbach

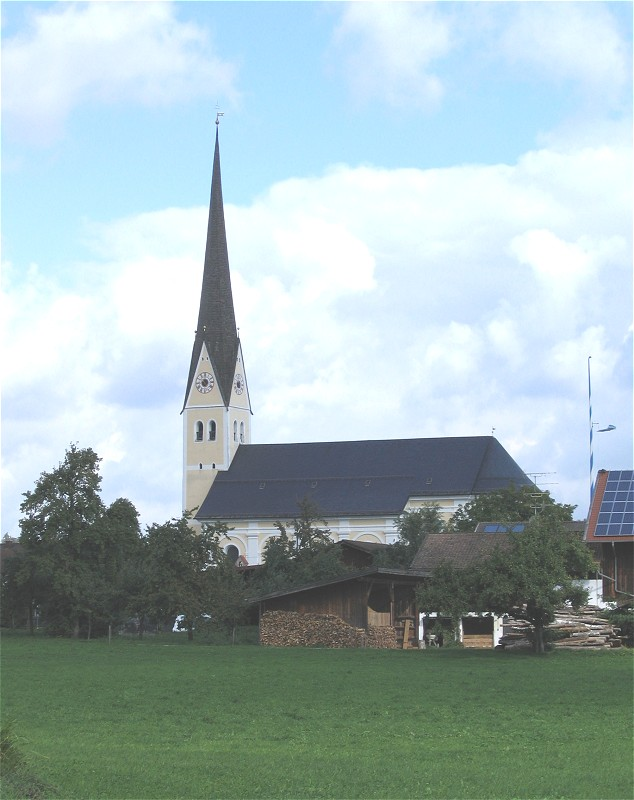
Au bei Bad Aibling

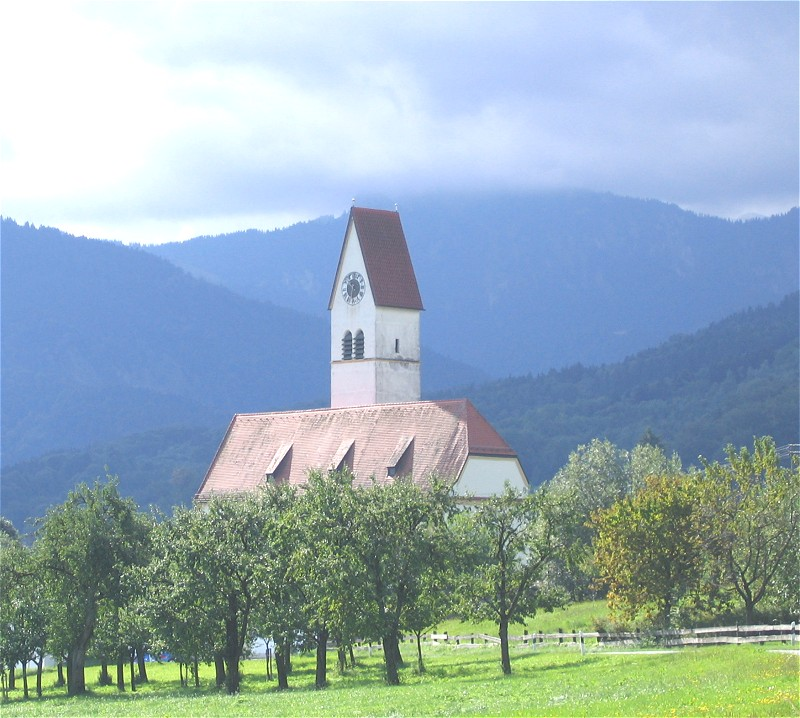
Lippertskirchen bei Bad Feilnbach

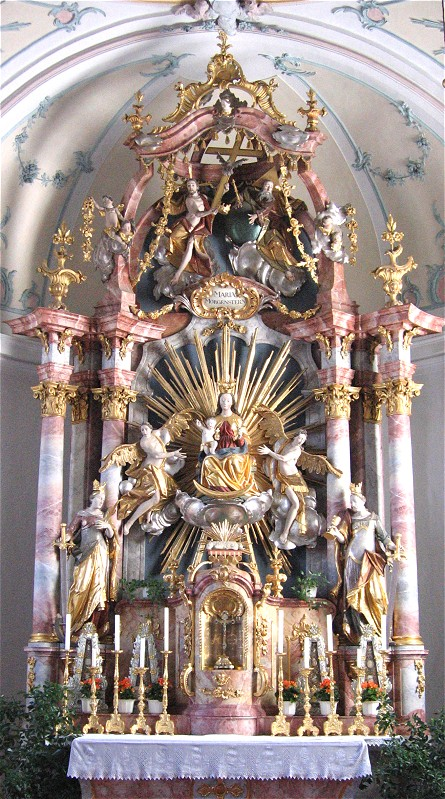
Altar in der Kirche von Lippertskirchen

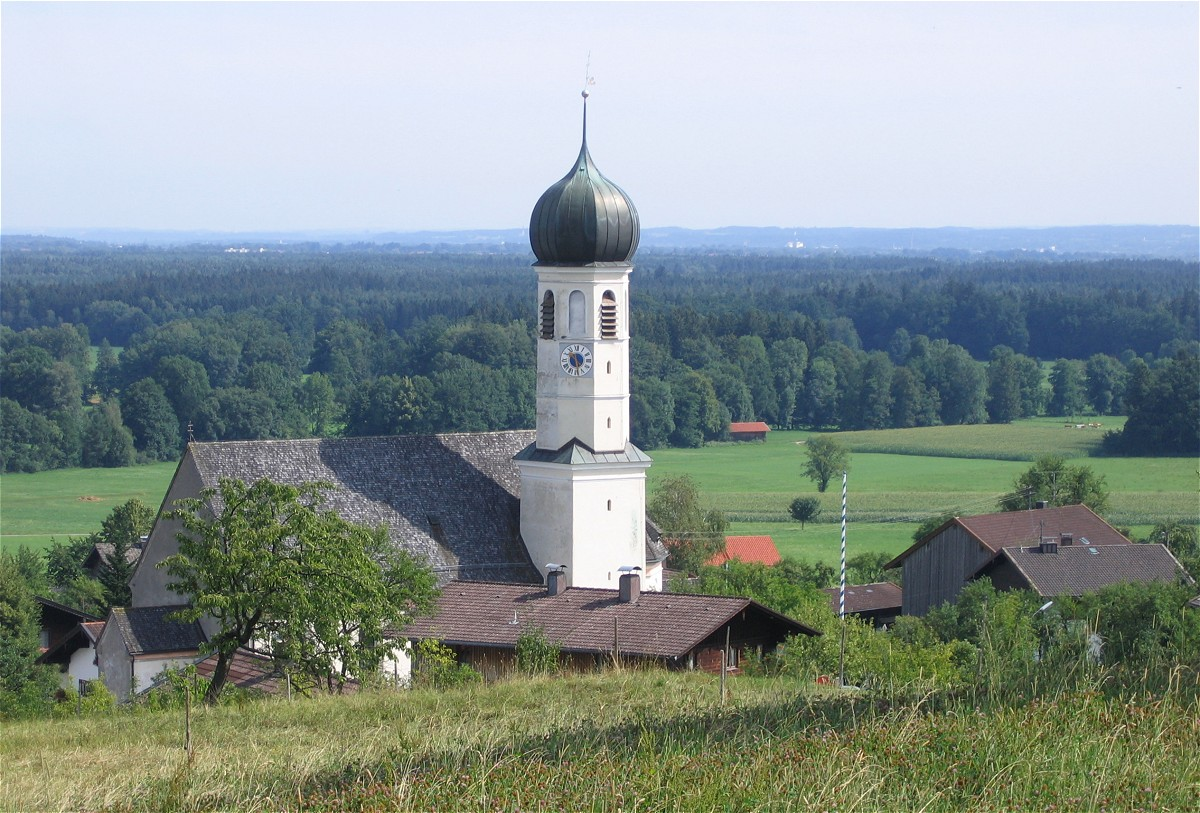
Kirche in Litzldorf

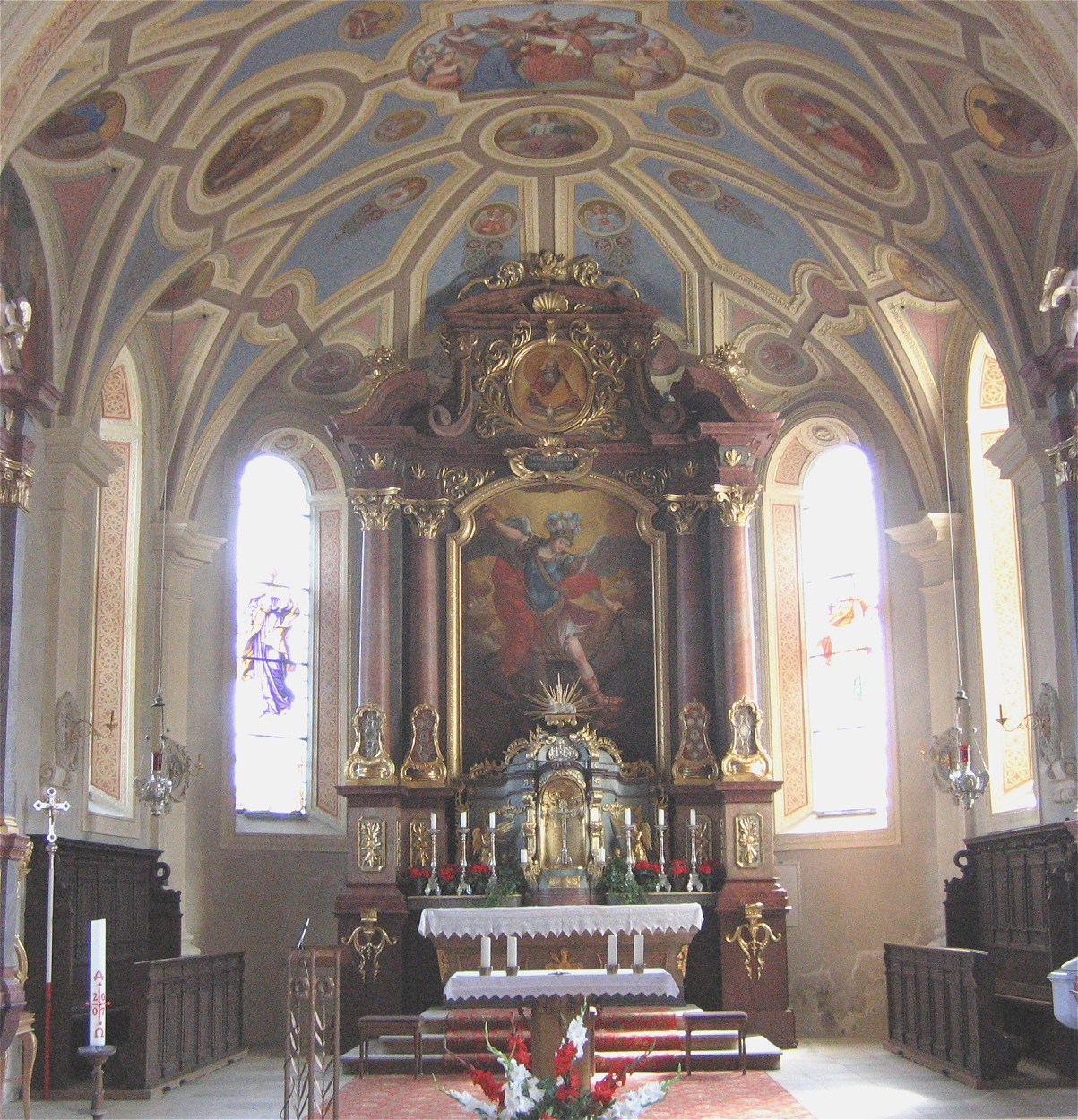
Kirche in Litzldorf

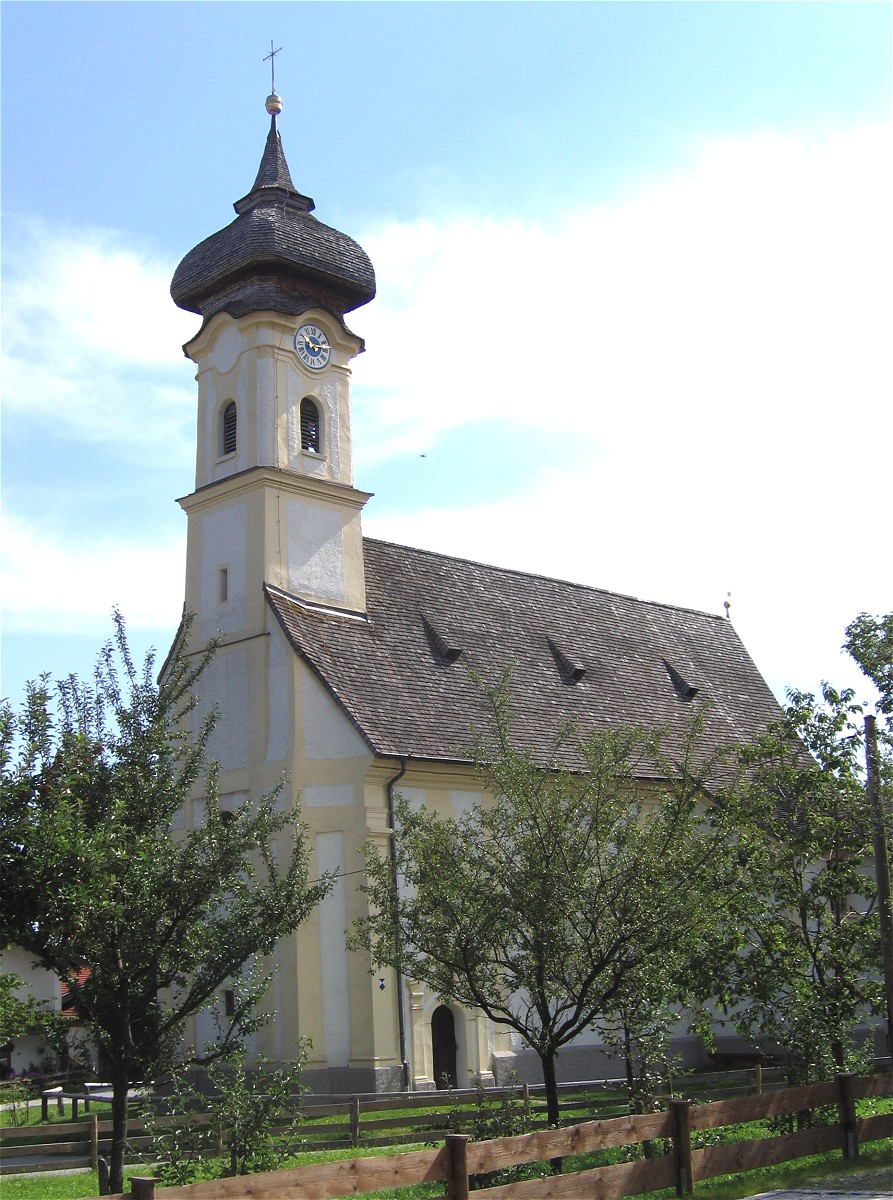
Kirche in Wiechs

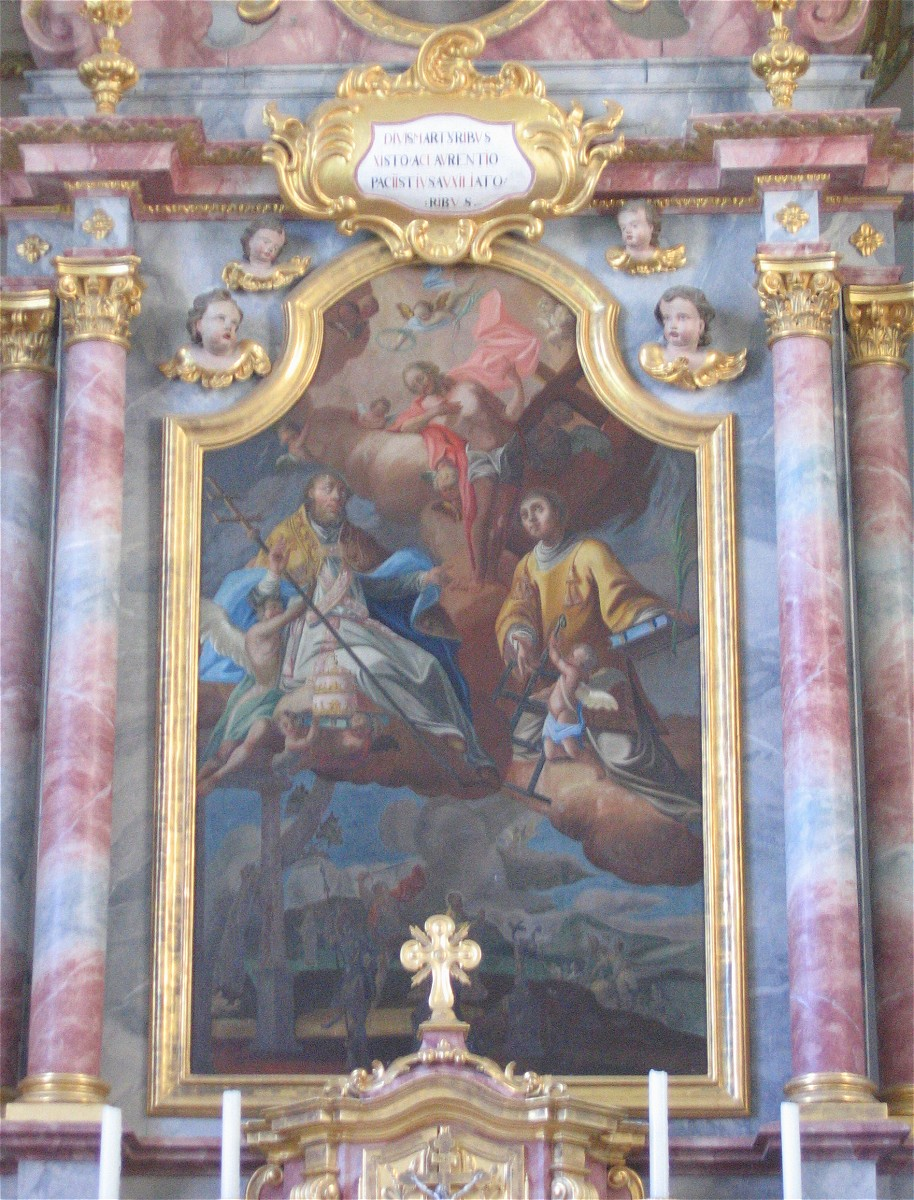
Kirche in Wiechs

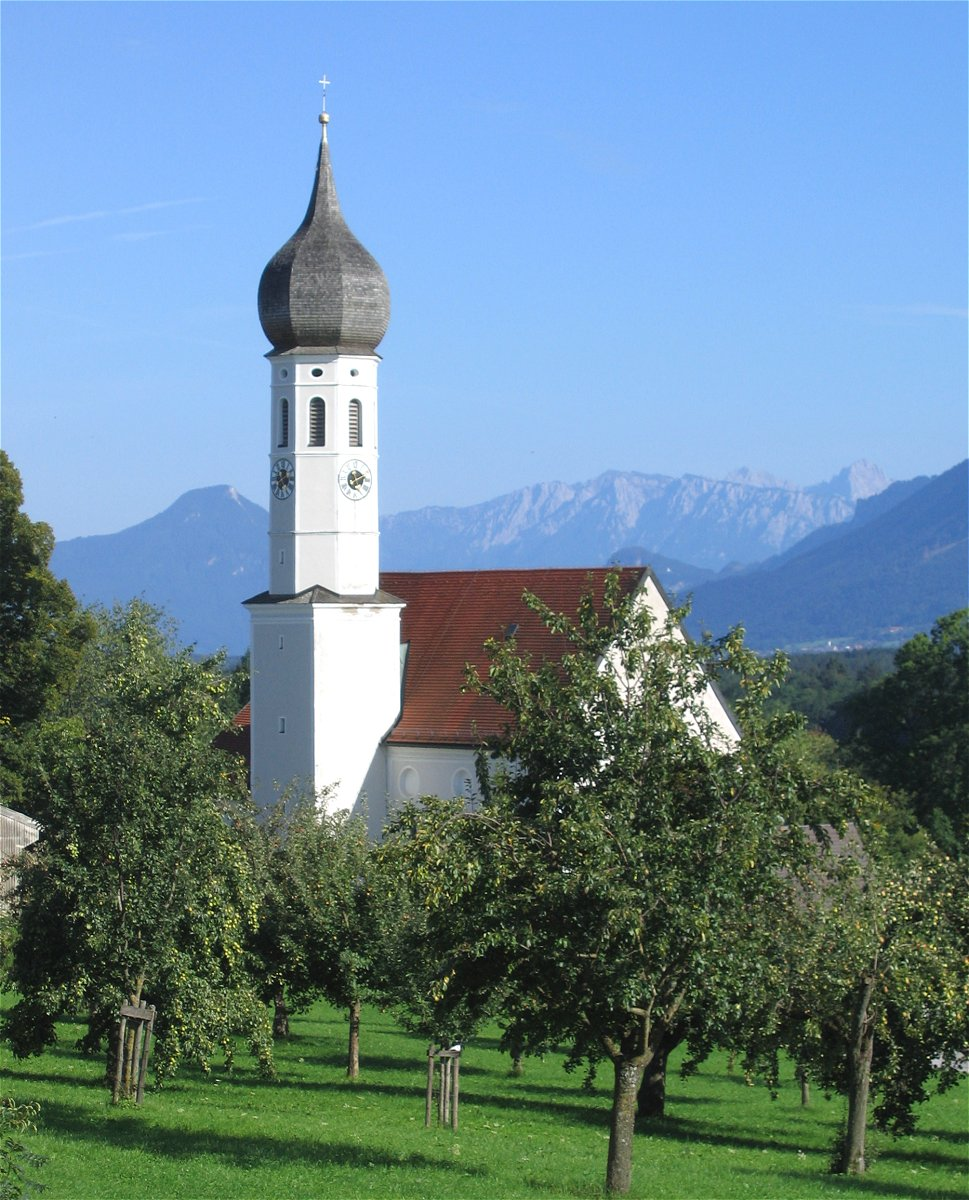
Kirche in Dettendorf
im Hintergrund Kranzhorn (links) und Kaisergebirge
