= Dalia Dorner =

Israeli-Turkish law professor and judge

- דליה דורנר
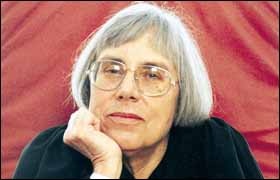

Justice of the Supreme Court of Israel
- In office 1993–2004
- Prime Minister: Yitzhak Rabin
- Minister: David Libai

Personal details
- Born: Dolly Greenberg; March 3, 1934 (age 92) Istanbul, Turkey
- Spouse: Shmuel Dorner
- Children: 2
- Education: Hebrew University of Jerusalem
- Occupation: Professor of law at Bar-Ilan University

Dalia Dorner (Hebrew: דליה דורנר; born March 3, 1934) is an Israeli-Turkish law professor and former Justice of the Supreme Court of Israel, serving from 1993 to 2004. She was one of the judges in the trial of John Demjanjuk.

== Biography ==
Dalia Dorner (née Dolly Greenberg) was born in Istanbul, Turkey. Her father, a wood merchant, Levy Greenberg, immigrated there from Odessa. Her family immigrated once again in 1944, this time to Mandatory Palestine, where her father died shortly after. Her mother sent her to a Youth Aliyah boarding school in Nahariya, from which she continued to the Hebrew Reali School in Haifa.

During her compulsory service in the IDF, she started her law studies in Tel Aviv. There she met her future husband, Shmuel. They married in 1958 and have two sons, Ariel Levy Bendor (b. 1963) and Amir Eliezer (b. 1965). After the army, she completed her law studies at the Hebrew University of Jerusalem.

== Legal career ==
Dorner worked for the Israel Police for a period, and then re-enlisted as an IDF officer in the Military Advocate General, rising up through the ranks to the position of Chief Military Defense. In 1974 she was appointed as a judge on the Military Court of Appeals, with the rank of Colonel. She was the first Israeli woman not serving in the Israeli Women's Corps to reach the ranks of Lieutenant Colonel and Colonel.

After retiring from the IDF, Dorner became a District Court Judge, first in the Southern District and later in the Jerusalem District. She was one of the judges who convicted John Demjanjuk and sentenced him to death in 1988, a decision overturned by Israel's Supreme Court, in 1993.

In April 1993, she was appointed a provisional Supreme Court Justice, and a year later this position was made permanent. In her position, Dorner proved to be an ardent advocate of human rights, as was expressed in her interpretation of the Basic Laws of Israel. At the same time she was considered unforgiving to white-collar crime. Toward the end of her career as a Justice she headed the Israeli Central Elections Committee.

Dorner retired from the Supreme Court on March 3, 2004. In August 2006, she was appointed president of the Israeli Press Council. She teaches human rights law at the Bar-Ilan University law faculty. She holds Honorary Doctorates from the Weizmann Institute of Science (2005), and from the Ben-Gurion University of the Negev (2008). She is an honorary member of the American Law Institute.

== Landmark rulings ==
Dorner required the military authorities to allow personalized epitaphs on soldiers' headstones. Her ruling emphasized the individual versus the collective, observing that "every child is an only child to his parents." She ruled that state must allocate adequate budgets to the Special Education Law to allow children with disabilities to be integrated into ordinary education frameworks. In the Jonathan Danilowitz case, she recognized the right of an El Al cabin attendant to receive a plane ticket for his homosexual partner. Dorner’s broad interpretation of free expression was illustrated in her ruling in the case of Kidum, a night school, which was permitted to use an advertising slogan, "Go and excel!", which has vulgar sexual connotations previously deemed unacceptable.

== Awards and honors ==
In 2010, Dorner was invited to light a torch at the Israeli Independence Day ceremony on Mount Herzl.
