= Evidence and documentation for the Holocaust =

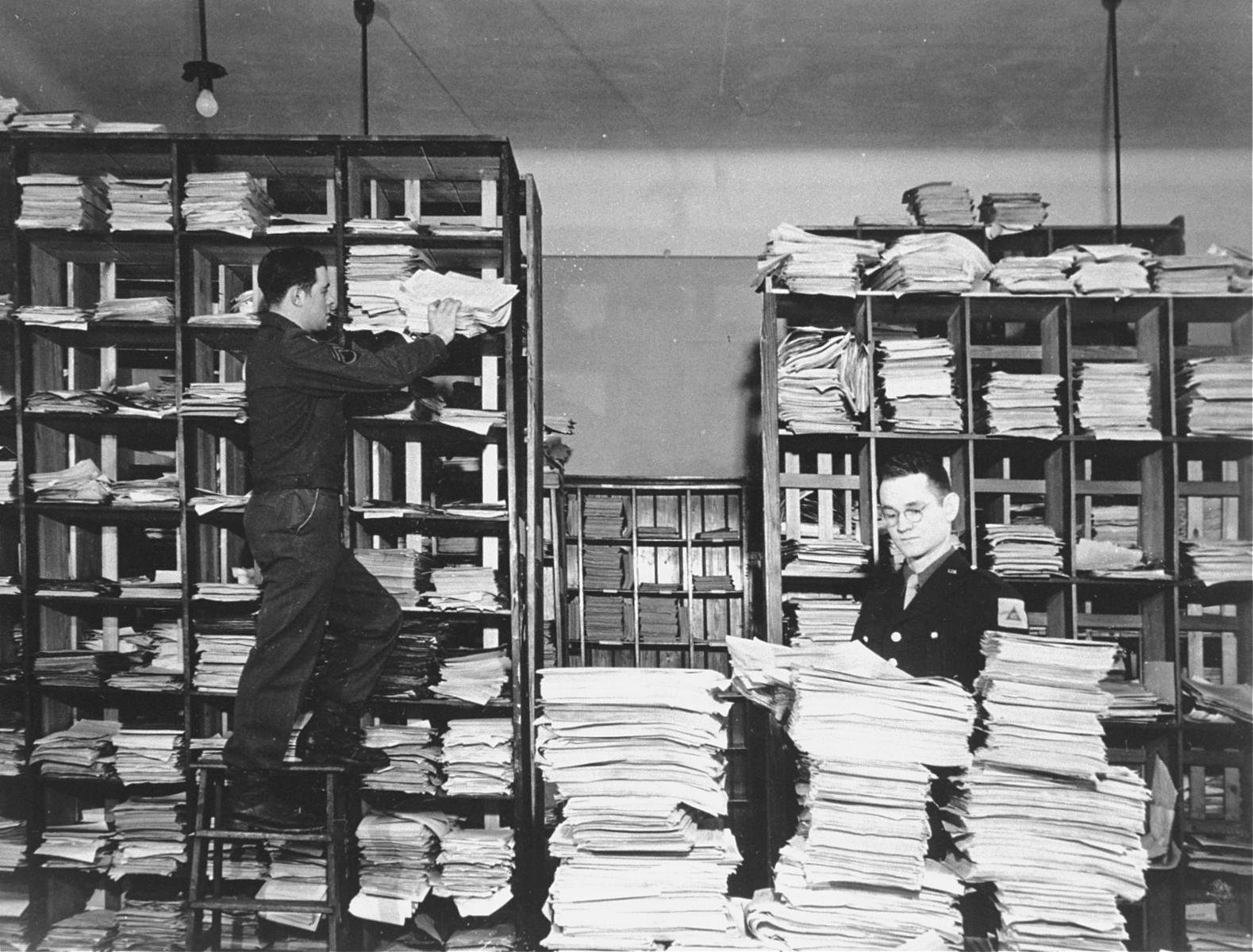
Evidence collected by the prosecution for the Nuremberg trials

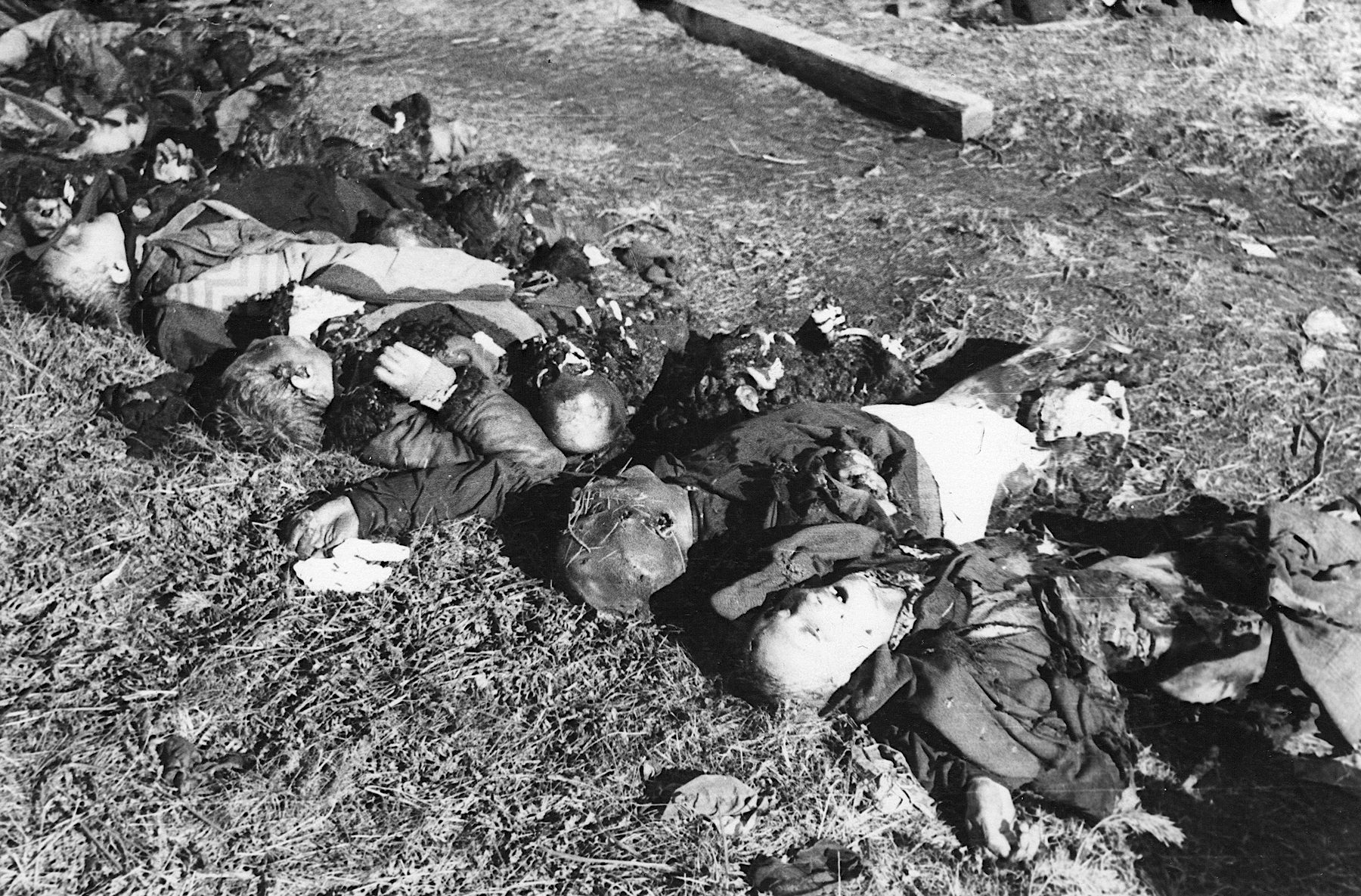
Corpses found at Klooga concentration camp by the Red Army

Holocaust death toll as a percentage of the total pre-war Jewish population in Europe

The Holocaust—the systematic killing of about six million Jews by Nazi Germany from 1941 to 1945—is the most documented genocide in history. Although there is no single document which lists the names of all Jewish victims of Nazi persecution, there is conclusive evidence that about six million Jews were murdered. There is also conclusive evidence that Jews were gassed at Auschwitz-Birkenau, the Operation Reinhard extermination camps, and in gas vans, and that there was a systematic plan by the Nazi leadership to murder them.

Evidence for the Holocaust comes in four main varieties:

- Contemporary documents, including a wide variety of "letters, memos, blueprints, orders, bills, speeches"; Holocaust train schedules and statistical summaries generated by the SS; and photographs, including official photographs, clandestine photographs by survivors, aerial photographs, and film footage of the liberation of the camps. More than 3,000 tons of records were collected for the Nuremberg trials.
- Later testimony from tens of thousands of eyewitnesses, including survivors such as Sonderkommandos, who directly witnessed the extermination process; perpetrators such as Nazi leaders, SS guards, and Nazi concentration camp commandants; and local townspeople. Moreover, virtually none of the perpetrators put on trial denied the reality of the systematic murder, with the most common excuse (where one was given) being that they were just following orders.
- Material evidence in the form of concentration and extermination camps, which still exist with various amounts of the original structure preserved, and thousands of mass graves containing the corpses of Holocaust victims.
- Circumstantial evidence: during World War II, the population of Jews in German-occupied Europe was reduced by about six million. About 2.7 million Jews were deported to Auschwitz-Birkenau, Kulmhof extermination camp, and the Operation Reinhard camps never to be seen or heard from again.

The perpetrators attempted to avoid creating explicit evidence and they also tried to destroy the documentary and material evidence of their crimes before the German defeat. Nevertheless, much of the evidence was preserved and collected by Allied investigators during and after the war, and the overwhelming evidence of the crimes ultimately made such erasure attempts futile. Collectively, the evidence refutes the arguments of Holocaust deniers that the Holocaust did not occur as described in historical scholarship.

== Hitler's involvement ==
=== Policy ===
Historians, including Ian Kershaw, Raul Hilberg, and Martin Broszat, indicate that no document exists showing that Hitler ordered the Holocaust. However, other evidence makes clear that Hitler knew about and ordered the genocide. Statements from top-ranking Nazis such as Adolf Eichmann, Joseph Goebbels, and Heinrich Himmler also indicate that Hitler orchestrated the Holocaust and statements from Hitler himself reveal his genocidal intentions toward Jewry.

=== Order and responsibility ===
Nazi Concentration Camps (1945) – Film produced by U.S. armed forces and presented at the Nuremberg trials (57:53)

In a draft of an internal memorandum, dated 18 September 1942, Reichsfuhrer SS Heinrich Himmler wrote that "in principle the Fuehrer's time is no longer to be burdened with these matters"; the memorandum goes on to outline Himmler's vision, including "The delivery of anti-social elements from the execution of their sentences to the Reich Fuehrer of SS to be worked to death. Persons under protective arrest, Jews, Gypsies, Russians and Ukrainians, Poles with more than 3-year sentences, Czechs and Germans with more than 8-year sentences according to the judgement of the Minister of Justice [Thierack]. First of all, the worst anti-social elements amongst those just mentioned are to be handed over; I shall inform the Fuhrer of this through Reichsleiter Bormann."

Nevertheless, and in contrast to the T4 euthanasia program, no document written or signed by Hitler ordering the Holocaust has ever been found. Deniers have claimed that this lack of order shows genocide was not Nazi policy.

During David Irving's unsuccessful libel action against Deborah Lipstadt, he indicated that he considered a document signed by Hitler ordering the 'Final Solution' would be the only convincing proof of Hitler's responsibility. He was, however, described as content to accuse Winston Churchill of responsibility for ordering the assassination of General Sikorski, despite having no documentary evidence to support his claim. Mr Justice Gray concluded that this was a double standard.

Historians have documented evidence that as Germany's defeat became imminent and the Nazi leaders realized that they would most likely be captured and brought to trial, a great effort to destroy all of the evidence of mass extermination was made. In the spring of 1942, Himmler ordered all of the traces of murdered Russian Jews and all of the traces of murdered prisoners of war to be removed from the occupied territories of the Soviet Union. As one of many examples, the bodies of the 25,000 mostly Latvian Jews whom Friedrich Jeckeln and the soldiers under his command had shot at Rumbula (near Riga) in late 1941 were dug up and burned in 1943.

In mid-1942, Reinhard Heydrich, through Heinrich Mueller, Chief of the Gestapo, ordered Paul Blobel in Sonderaktion 1005 to remove all traces of the mass executions in the East carried out by the Einsatzgruppen. After Blobel and his staff developed a special incineration process, destruction of evidence at Belzec and Sobibor followed in late 1942. In February 1943, Himmler personally visited Treblinka and ordered the commandants to destroy records, crematoria, and other signs of mass extermination.

The minutes of a meeting between Hitler, Foreign Minister Joachim von Ribbentrop and Regent of Hungary Miklós Horthy on 17 April 1943 show that Hitler told Horthy that the Hungarian Jewish population should be put to work, and those who would not or could not work would be shot. A few minutes later von Ribbentrop told Horthy, in Hitler's presence, that the Hungarian Jews were all to be killed or sent to concentration camps. When von Ribbentrop was questioned about the exchange at the Nuremberg trials he confirmed that Hitler had demanded the deaths of Jews unable to work during the meeting.

In the Posen speeches of October 1943, Himmler explicitly referred to the extermination of the Jews of Europe and further stated that the genocide must be permanently kept secret. On 4 October, he said:

I also want to refer here very frankly to a very difficult matter. We can now very openly talk about this among ourselves, and yet we will never discuss this publicly. Just as we did not hesitate on June 30, 1934, to perform our duty as ordered and put comrades who had failed up against the wall and execute them, we also never spoke about it, nor will we ever speak about it. Let us thank God that we had within us enough self-evident fortitude never to discuss it among us, and we never talked about it. Every one of us was horrified, and yet every one clearly understood that we would do it next time, when the order is given and when it becomes necessary. I am now referring to the evacuation of the Jews, to the extermination of the Jewish people.

Historian Peter Longerich states that Hitler "avoided giving a clear written order to exterminate Jewish civilians". Wide protest was evoked when Hitler's authorisation of the T4 program became public knowledge in Germany, and he was forced to put a halt to it as a result (nonetheless it continued discreetly). This made Hitler realise that such undertakings must be done secretly in order to avoid criticism. Critics also point out that if Hitler did sign such an order in the first place, it would have been one of the first documents to be destroyed.

Evidence of a verbal order from Hitler includes a handwritten note by Himmler on a meeting with Hitler at the Wolfsschanze on 18 December 1941, which read: "Jewish Question; to be exterminated as partisans". Historians have argued that this indicates Hitler gave a verbal order to Himmler at this meeting for the Einsatzgruppen to target Jews under the guise of anti-partisan warfare.

According to Felix Kersten's memoirs, Himmler told him that the extermination of the Jews was expressly ordered by Hitler and had been delegated to Himmler.

==== According to Nazis ====
Many statements from the Nazis from 1941 onwards addressed the imminent extermination of the Jews.

In a draft of an internal memorandum, dated 25 October 1941, Heinrich Himmler wrote:

As the affairs now stand, there are no objections against doing away with those Jews who are not able to work, with the Brack remedy.

SS officer Alfred Franke-Gricksch quoted Himmler as stating that Hitler had "decided to blot out once and for all the biological basis of Judaism".

Joseph Goebbels had frequent discussions with Hitler about the fate of the Jews, a subject which they discussed almost every time they met, and frequently wrote about it in his personal diary. In his personal diary he wrote:

- 12 December 1941: "Regarding the Jewish question, the Führer is determined to clear the table. He warned the Jews that if they were to cause another world war, it would lead to their own destruction. Those were not empty words. Now the world war has come. The destruction of the Jews must be its necessary consequence. We cannot be sentimental about it."
- 14 February 1942: "The Führer once again expressed his determination to clean up the Jews in Europe pitilessly. There must be no squeamish sentimentalism about it. The Jews have deserved the catastrophe that has now overtaken them. Their destruction will go hand in hand with the destruction of our enemies. We must hasten this process with cold ruthlessness."
- 27 March 1942: "A judgment is being visited upon the Jews that, while barbaric, is fully deserved by them. The prophecy which the Führer made about them for having brought on a new world war is beginning to come true in a most terrible manner. One must not be sentimental in these matters. If we did not fight the Jews, they would destroy us. It's a life-and-death struggle between the Aryan race and the Jewish bacillus."

On 16 November 1941, Goebbels published an article "The Jews are to blame" which returned to Hitler's prophecy of 1939 and stated that world Jewry was suffering a "gradual process of extermination". Goebbels wrote: "Some six million Jews still live in the East, and this question can only be solved by a biological extermination of the whole of Jewry in Europe".

On 13 March 1945, Goebbels wrote in his diary that the "rest of the world" should follow Germany's example in "destroying the Jews", he wrote also about how the Jews in Germany at that point had been almost totally destroyed. This diary contains numerous other references to the mass extermination of Jews, including how "tens of thousands of them are liquidated" in eastern occupied territory, and that "the greater the number of Jews liquidated, the more consolidated will the situation in Europe be after this war." When speaking about this document under oath, David Irving is quoted as saying "There is no explicit reference...to the liquidation of Jews" and critics of Holocaust denial consequently state that it is dishonest to say such a thing when it is entirely contradicted by the diary of one of Hitler's closest associates.

When questioned by interrogators if orders for the extermination of Jews were delegated in writing by Himmler, Adolf Eichmann stated:

I never saw a written order, Herr Hauptmann. All I know is that Heydrich said to me: "The Führer has ordered the physical extermination of the Jews." He said that as clearly and surely as I'm repeating it now.

Critics state that Eichmann gave a virtually identical account of this in his memoirs, and state that it is also asserted that Eichmann never even asked for a written order, on the basis that "Hitler's wish as expressed through Himmler and Heydrich was good enough for him". Eichmann's memoirs were recorded by Willem Sassen before he was captured, and Eichmann's lawyer tried to prevent them from being presented as evidence to avoid any detriment against his case.

In a speech, David Irving states that Heydrich told Eichmann, "The Führer has given the order for the physical destruction of the Jews". Irving admits that this contradicts his view that "Hitler wasn't involved", but explains it by suggesting that a completely different meaning can be construed, i.e. "the extirpation of Judaism" as opposed to the physical destruction of Jews if one changes "just one or two words". Critics of this view state that historians should not change words if their documents contradict their claims, and consequently point out five instances where Eichmann unambiguously states "physical extermination" during his interrogation.

At a conference in 1941 discussing the Jewish Question, Alfred Rosenberg said:

Some six million Jews still live in the East, and this question can only be solved by a biological extermination of the whole of Jewry in Europe. The Jewish Question will only be solved for Germany when the last Jew has left German territory, and for Europe when not a single Jew stands on the European continent as far as the Urals... And to this end it is necessary to force them beyond the Urals or otherwise bring about their eradication.

At the Einsatzgruppen Trial in 1947, SS-Obersturmbannfuhrer Martin Sandberger recalled that his superior, SS-Gruppenfuhrer Bruno Streckenbach, had informed him and other Einsatzgruppen commanders of an order from Hitler to eliminate all Jews in the Eastern Territories at a meeting at the Palais Prinz Albrecht in 1941.

Rudolf Höss, commandant of the Auschwitz concentration camp, wrote a series of memoirs about his role in the Holocaust while awaiting execution after the war. In these memoirs Höss stated that Himmler had briefed him about the Final Solution and his role in it in summer 1941; during the meeting, Himmler told him that the order for the Final Solution came directly from Hitler.

=== Awareness ===
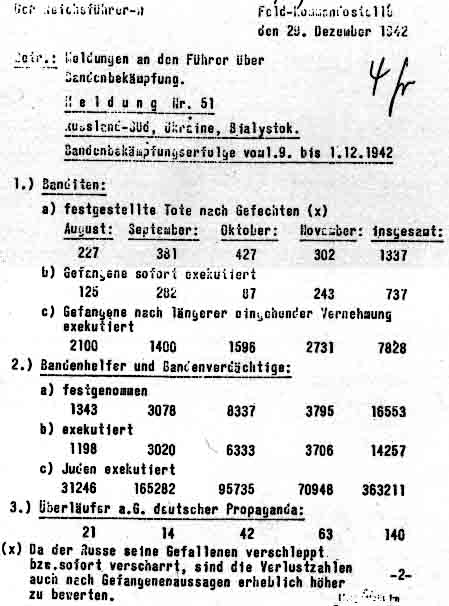
Report to Hitler detailing the executions of prisoners

Congruent with the evidence that shows Hitler was responsible for the order to murder Jews, there is also evidence that shows he was made aware of the process. Gestapo Chief Heinrich Müller sent a telegram on 2 August 1941, ordering that "especially interesting illustrative" material should be sent to Berlin because, "the Führer should be presented with continuous reports on the work of Einsatzgruppen in the East from here". At the end of December 1942 Hitler received a document from Himmler entitled, "Report to the Führer on Combating Partisans", stating that 363,211 Jews had been murdered by the Einsatzgruppen in August–November 1942. This document was specifically printed in large font that Hitler could read without glasses and was marked "Shown to the Führer".

== Himmler's speeches ==
Critics of Holocaust denial state that the claim by deniers of no Nazi plan to exterminate the Jews is discredited by Himmler in a speech made on 4 October 1943 to a gathering of SS officers in Poznań, where he said:

Original	Translated
Ich meine jetzt die "Judenevakuierung", die Ausrottung des jüdischen Volkes. Es gehört zu den Dingen, die man leicht ausspricht. – ‚Das jüdische Volk wird ausgerottet’, sagt ein jeder Parteigenosse‚ 'ganz klar, steht in unserem Programm, Ausschaltung der Juden, Ausrottung, machen wir.'	I am currently talking about the "evacuation of the Jews", the extermination of the Jewish people. It is one of those things that is easily said. 'The Jewish people are being exterminated,' every Party member says, 'perfectly clear, it's written in our program, elimination of the Jews, extermination, and we do that.'

"Die Ausrottung des jüdischen Volkes"
An excerpt of this speech where Himmler discusses the ongoing extermination of the Jews

In a speech at Sonthofen on 24 May 1944, Himmler said to a group of German generals:

I believe, gentlemen, that you know me well enough to realize that I am not a bloodthirsty man nor a man who takes pleasure or finds sport in the harsher things he must do. On the other hand, I have strong nerves and a great sense of duty—if I do say so myself—and when I recognize the necessity to do something, I will do it unflinchingly. As to the Jewish women and children, I did not believe I had a right to let these children grow up to become avengers who would kill our fathers [sic] and grandchildren. That, I thought, would be cowardly.

== Use of gas chambers ==
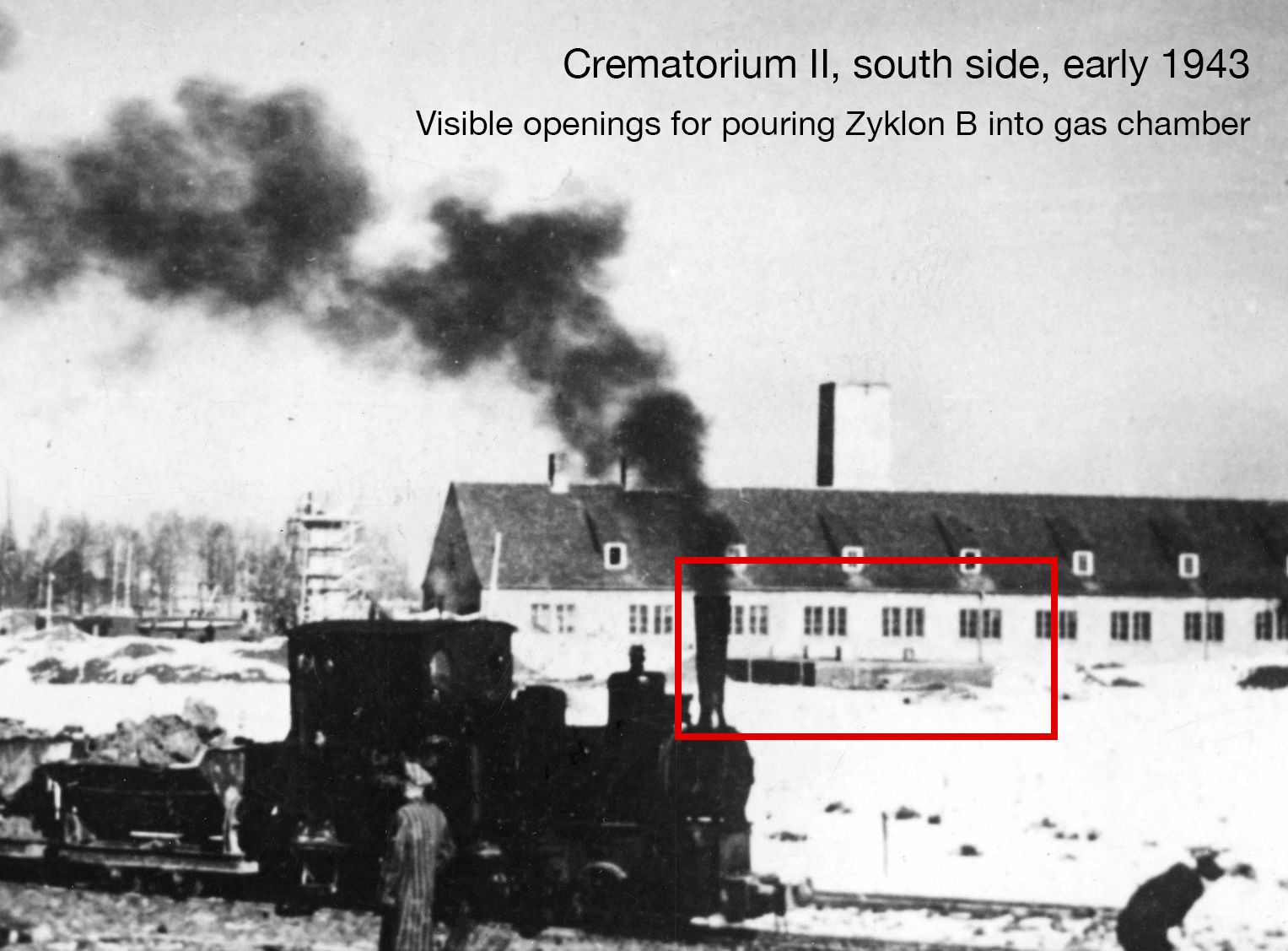
Photo of the under construction Auschwitz Birkenau crematorium II taken in February 1943 by SS man Dietrich Kammann. The openings through which Zyklon B was poured into the gas chamber are visible. Poles Ludwik Lawin and Taduesz Kubik, who worked in the camp photography studio, stole a number of Kammann’s negatives and buried them.

The German firm Topf and Sons manufactured gas chambers to be used in concentration camps for extermination. The company also produced crematorium ovens which were specially designed to allow the cremation of multiple bodies at once. An internal company memo discovered in 2004 describes a September 1942 meeting between company engineer Kurt Prüfer and an SS officer at which Prüfer was informed that a cremation capacity of 2,650 per day was insufficient for a concentration camp. This document refutes a claim made by Holocaust deniers that the crematoria at Auschwitz and other camps were only used for ordinary sanitation purposes. Prüfer subsequently applied for a patent on a four-storey crematorium equipped with conveyor belts, designed to increase the rate at which bodies could be cremated. Interrogated after the war, Prüfer and other senior Topf employees admitted that they were aware of the purpose of the gas chambers and had witnessed them being used to murder camp inmates.

A 1943 letter written by Karl Bischoff, the chief of construction at Auschwitz-Birkenau, to Hans Kammler describes the installation of a "gassing cellar" at Crematoria II. Extant communications between camp staff and Topf show that this same room was fitted with gas detectors and gas-proof doors, and that it was preheated before use to allow the gas to vaporize rapidly, undermining claims by deniers that the room was a morgue rather than a gas chamber.

Zoomed in detail of the photograph above with the apertures through which Zyklon B was poured into the gas chamber can be seen.

The search for cyanide in the bricks of buildings said to have been gas chambers was important, because the pesticide Zyklon B would generate such a residue. This was the gas most often cited as the murder instrument for prisoners in the gas chambers, supported by both testimony and evidence collected of Nazi policy. Despite the difficulty of finding traces of this material, in February 1990, Professor Jan Markiewicz, Director of the Institute of Forensic Research in Kraków, redid the analysis. Markiewicz and his team used microdiffusion techniques to test for cyanide in samples from the suspected gas chambers, from delousing chambers, and from control areas elsewhere within Auschwitz. The control samples tested negative, while cyanide residue was found in high concentrations in the delousing chambers, and lower concentrations in the homicidal gas chambers. This is consistent with the amounts required to kill lice and humans.

Another claim made by Holocaust deniers is that there were no specially-constructed vents in the gas chambers through which Zyklon B could be released. Historian Deborah Lipstadt offers a response showing that this claim is not consistent with the physical evidence:

Deniers have said for years that physical evidence is lacking because they have seen no holes in the roof of the Birkenau gas chamber where the Zyklon was poured in. (In some of the gas chambers the Zyklon B was poured in through the roof, while in others it was thrown in through the windows.) The roof was dynamited at war's end, and today lies broken in pieces, but three of the four original holes were positively identified in a recent paper. Their location in the concrete matches with eyewitness testimony, aerial photos from 1944, and a ground photo from 1943. The physical evidence shows unmistakably that the Zyklon holes were cast into the concrete when the building was constructed.

Deniers also claim that the doors of gas chambers, some of which were made out of wood, were not airtight enough for the chambers to have worked correctly, an assertion contradicted by documentation from the SS construction office describing the manufacture of gastight doors.

Cremation in the open at the Reinhard extermination camps (Treblinka, Sobibor and Belzec) was discussed at Nuremberg on 7 April 1946 by Georg Konrad Morgen, SS judge and lawyer who investigated crimes committed in Nazi concentration camps. He stated: "The whole thing was like an assembly line. At the last stop they reached a big room, and were told that this was the bath. When the last one was in, the doors were shut and the gas was let into the room. As soon as death taken place in (sic), the ventilators were started. When the air was breathable, the doors were opened, and the Jewish workers removed the bodies. By means of a special process which Wirth had invented, they were burned in the open air without the use of fuel."

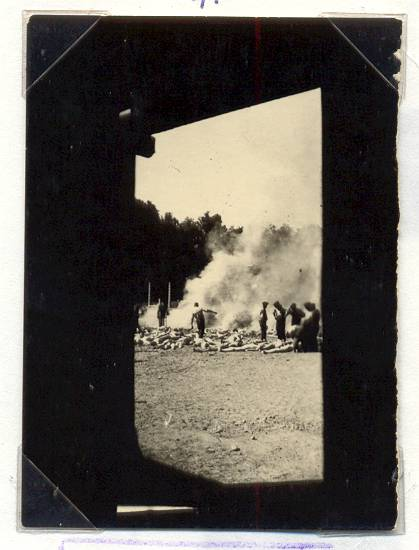
Sonderkommando photo No. 280 taken covertly, showing a cremation pit in use outside a gas chamber at Auschwitz

There is well-documented evidence that other ash was used as fertilizer in nearby fields. Photographs of Treblinka taken by the camp commandant show what looks to be ash piles being distributed by steam shovels.

The Nizkor Project and other sources have stated that the minimal concentration of Zyklon B to be explosive is 56,000 parts per million, while 300 parts per million is fatal to humans, as is evidenced in The Merck Index and the CRC Handbook of Chemistry and Physics. In fact, the Nazis' own documentation stated "Danger of explosion: 75 grams of HCN in 1 cubic meter of air. Normal application approx. 8–10 grams per cubic meter, therefore not explosive."

The Institute for Historical Review publicly offered a reward of $50,000 for verifiable "proof that gas chambers for the purpose of killing human beings existed at or in Auschwitz." Mel Mermelstein, a survivor of Auschwitz, submitted his own testimony as proof but it was ignored. He then sued IHR in the United States and the case was subsequently settled for $50,000, plus $40,000 in damages for personal suffering. The court declared the statement that "Jews were gassed to death at the Auschwitz Concentration Camp in Poland during the summer of 1944" was a fact.

== Victims ==
=== Six million ===
The vast majority of scholars, institutions, and one Nazi official estimate between five and six million Jews perished during the Holocaust. With approximately 4.5 million Jewish victims' names collected by Yad Vashem, numerous documents and archives discovered after the war gave meticulous accounts of the exterminations that took place at the death camps (such as Auschwitz and Treblinka).

=== Jewish population ===
The 1932 American Jewish Yearbook estimates the total number of Jews in the world at 15,192,218, of whom 9,418,248 resided in Europe. However, the 1947 yearbook states:

Estimates of the world Jewish population have been assembled by the American Jewish Joint Distribution Committee (except for the United States and Canada) and are probably the most authentic available at the present time. The figures reveal that the total Jewish population of the world has decreased by one-third from about 16,600,000 in 1939 to about 11,000,000 in 1946 as the result of the annihilation by the Nazis of more than five and a half million European Jews. In Europe only an estimated 3,642,000 remain of the total Jewish pre-war population of approximately 9,740,000.

These numbers are also consistent with the findings of the Anglo-American Committee of Inquiry in 1946.

== Nazi documentation ==
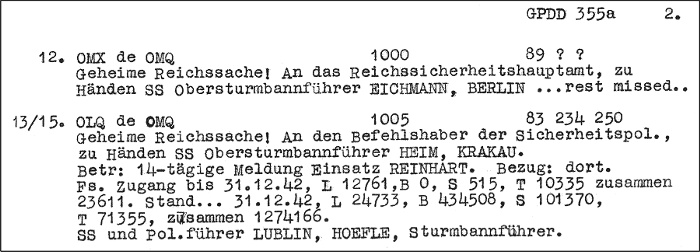
The Höfle Telegram

The Nazis used figures of between 9 and 11 million for the Jewish population of Europe, as evidenced in the notes of the Wannsee Conference. In fact, the Nazis methodically recorded the ongoing reduction of the Jewish population, as in the Korherr Report, which gave the status of the Final Solution through December 1942. This report, compiled by an SS statistician, gave a conservative total of 2,454,000 Jews deported to extermination camps or murdered by the Einsatzgruppen. The Höfle Telegram was sent by Hermann Höfle on 11 January 1943 to Adolf Eichmann in Berlin and detailed the number of Jews murdered in the concentration camps. In the year 1942 alone, the telegram lists 1,274,166 Jews were exterminated in the four camps of Aktion Reinhard.

The complete status reports of the Einsatzgruppen death squads were found in the archives of the Gestapo when it was searched by the U.S. Army, and the accuracy attested to by the former Einsatzgruppen members who testified during war crime trials and at other times. These reports alone list an additional 1,500,000 or so murders during mass shootings. For example, the nine-page Jäger Report describes in detail 137,346 killings conducted by Einsatzkommando 3 over the course of five months. The vast majority of these victims were Jews. Further, surviving Nazi documentation spells out their plans to murder the Jews of Europe (see the Wannsee Conference), recorded the trains arriving at various death camps, and included photographs and films of many atrocities.

== Testimonies ==
There is a voluminous amount of testimony from tens of thousands of survivors of the Holocaust describing their experiences in the concentration camps. The USC Shoah Foundation and other groups conducted and recorded interviews with over 58,000 witnesses to the Holocaust, including Jewish survivors and other victims of Nazi persecution such as homosexuals, Jehovah's Witnesses and Romani, as well as Allied soldiers who had been inside the camps.

Many former Nazis also admitted the reality of the Holocaust during the Nuremberg Trials and at other times. Höss's testimony did not consist of merely a signed confession; while in jail he also wrote two volumes of memoirs and gave extensive testimony outside of the Nuremberg proceedings. Further, his testimony agrees with that of other contemporary written accounts by Auschwitz officials, such as Pery Broad, an SS man stationed at Auschwitz while Höss was the commandant, and the diary kept by SS physician at Auschwitz Johann Kremer, as well as the testimony of hundreds of camp guards and victims. Auschwitz guard Reinhold Hanning even testified that it was common knowledge among camp personnel that "the majority of people who arrived in the trains were killed". In addition, former SS personnel have criticised Holocaust denial. SS-Oberscharführer Josef Klehr said that anyone who maintains that nobody was gassed at Auschwitz must be "crazy or on the wrong". SS-Unterscharführer Oswald Kaduk stated that he did not consider those who maintain such a thing as normal people. Karl Frenzel, a senior officer at the Sobibor extermination camp, stated in a 1983 interview that "It is wrong to say that it never happened" in reference to Jews being gassed at the camp. Hearing about Holocaust denial compelled former SS-Rottenführer Oskar Gröning to publicly speak about what he witnessed at Auschwitz and denounce Holocaust deniers, stating:

I would like you to believe me. I saw the gas chambers. I saw the crematoria. I saw the open fires. I was on the ramp when the selections took place. I would like you to believe that these atrocities happened because I was there.

Hans Münch, a former SS physician, signed a document certifying what he witnessed at Auschwitz: "thousands of people gassed", and the usage of Zyklon B in gas chambers. According to Münch's estimation, prisoners died within three to five minutes of exposure to Zyklon B. In an interview on Swedish television in 1981 Münch described the extermination process in detail and confirmed that "special treatment" in the context of Auschwitz referred to physical extermination. In another interview, Münch stated that anyone who believed in Holocaust denial could only be "a malevolent person who has some personal interest to want to bury in silence things that cannot be buried".

During Fedorenko v. United States, a deportation case involving former Treblinka guard Feodor Fedorenko, he testified that he had been stationed in a guard tower overlooking the camp and admitted that the gas chambers were visible from this vantage point and that he had witnessed dead bodies being removed from the gas chambers on multiple occasions.

In the 1983 Holocaust documentary Shoah, Unterscharführer Franz Suchomel, tricked into an interview with false promises of anonymity, described his time at the Treblinka extermination camp. Suchomel related to the interviewer, Claude Lanzmann, how he saw dead bodies being removed from the gas chambers during a tour of the camp before explaining in depth the extermination of Jews at the camp through both gassing and shooting.

Sonderkommandos provide another key piece of testimony. These were Jewish prisoners who helped march Jews to the gas chambers, and later dragged the bodies to the crematoria. Since they witnessed the entire process, their testimony is vital in confirming that the gas chambers were used for murderous purposes and the scale to which they were used.

Other key testimony comes from non-Jewish survivors of the camps such as Catholic French Resistance member André Rogerie who was held in seven different camps, and who as a member of the Resistance was not targeted for extermination but for hard labor and survived. After the war Rogerie wrote and testified extensively about his experiences in the camps including Auschwitz-Birkenau, where he viewed and produced the oldest contemporary sketch of a camp crematorium.

The British parliament dispatched a delegation to Buchenwald concentration camp in April 1945 to gather evidence of the Holocaust. Consisting of eight Members of Parliament and two Lords, the delegation visited Buchenwald on April 21 and presented its report to Parliament on April 27. In the report, the members of the delegation described witnessing conditions of "intense general squalor" and overcrowding, inmates who had been beaten and starved to the point of malnutrition, and large piles of dead bodies, as well as human skeletons in the crematoria. They also conducted interviews with camp survivors who told them that inmates were killed "almost daily". The report concluded that "it is our considered and unanimous opinion, on the evidence available to us, that a policy of steady starvation and inhuman brutality was carried out at Buchenwald for a long period of time".
