= Fedorenko =

Fedorenko (Ukrainian: Федоренко) is a Ukrainian surname meaning son or daughter of "Fedir" (the Ukrainian rendition of Theodore).

It may refer to:

- Andriy Fedorenko, a Ukrainian football player.
- Borys Fedorenko, Ukrainian painter.
- Dmitri Nikolayevitch Fedorenko, Russian entomologist
- Fyodor Fedorenko, sentenced to death for treason and participation in the Holocaust and executed.
- Mykola Fedorenko, retired Soviet football player and a current Ukrainian football coach.
- Nikolai Fedorenko, Soviet philologist, orientalist, statesman, public figure, professor (1953), and corresponding member of the Soviet Academy of Sciences (1958).
- Nikolay Fedorenko, Russian economist and chemist.
- Yakov Fedorenko, Soviet general during World War II.

It may also refer to the landmark legal case of Fedorenko v. United States.

== See also ==
- Fedoruk
- Fedorchuk
