= Anton Geiser =

Guard in a Nazi concentration camp

- Born: October 17, 1924; Đak-Selci, Kingdom of Yugoslavia
- Died: December 26, 2012 (aged 88); Pittsburgh, Pennsylvania, U.S.
- Resting place: Hermitage, Pennsylvania, U.S.

Anton Geiser (surname also spelled Geisser; October 17, 1924 – December 26, 2012) was a Yugoslav-born member of the SS-Totenkopfverbände during World War II, who served as a guard at both the Sachsenhausen and Buchenwald concentration camps. In 1956 he moved to the United States, settling in Sharon, Pennsylvania, where he had family. In 1962 he became a naturalized American citizen. In 2006 he was stripped of his citizenship on the grounds that it would not have been granted had the full details of his role in the German military been known; in 2010 a US judge ordered him deported to Austria, the country from which he had immigrated. He died in Pittsburgh on December 21, 2012, while still battling his deportation.

== Background ==
Geiser was born in Yugoslavia on October 17, 1924, in the village of Selci Đakovački (part of Đakovo) in eastern Croatia. In September 1942, shortly following the invasion of Yugoslavia by Nazi Germany, Geiser, an ethnic German, was drafted into the Waffen SS. He was 17 years old at the time.

== SS career ==
Once in the SS, he was chosen to be a member of the SS-Totenkopfverbände, the so-called "Death's Head Battalion" that most concentration camp guards belonged to. He was sent to the Sachsenhausen concentration camp near Oranienburg for training, where he was told that as a matter of policy prisoners attempting escape were to be shot. While there, he served as a perimeter guard and escorted prisoners to and from labor sites. Later, he served at the Buchenwald concentration camp in a similar capacity, escorting prisoners to the Arolsen subcamp as necessary and finally aiding with the evacuation of Arolsen's prisoners back to Buchenwald when the subcamp was closed near the war's end.

== Life after World War II ==
After World War II ended, Geiser lived in Germany for three years before moving to Austria in 1948 to be with his girlfriend, Theresia (1925-2011). He married Theresia in Austria before immigrating to the United States in 1956. After arriving in the United States, Geiser settled in Sharon, Pennsylvania, about 75 miles (120 km) northwest of Pittsburgh, and worked as a steel worker for Sharon Steel Corporation before retiring in 1987, raising three children in the process. He became naturalized as a United States citizen on March 27, 1962.

== Loss of US citizenship, deportation, and death ==
By the late 1990s, Geiser was under investigation by the United States government's Office of Special Investigations for his World War II-era activities. Finally, on August 9, 2004, the United States government filed suit to revoke Geiser's citizenship. On September 29, 2006, US District Court Judge David S. Cercone of Pittsburgh, Pennsylvania, ordered the revocation of Geiser's US citizenship, citing Title 8 Chapter 12 § 1451(a) of the US Code, which states that citizenship should be revoked and the certificate of naturalization canceled "on the ground that such order and certificate of naturalization were illegally procured or were procured by concealment of a material fact or by willful misrepresentation". In support of the illegal procurement claim, he cited Fedorenko v. United States, which specifically established the precedent that voluntary or involuntary assistants of Nazi persecutions were not eligible for US visas, and therefore that the revocation verbiage of the law applies.

Geiser claimed—and the US government did not dispute—that during his career as an SS guard he was never personally directly responsible for the death of an inmate, and that he in fact was friendly with some of them. On these grounds he appealed the decision, arguing that the term "persecution" was ambiguous and required clarification, and that in particular it did not apply to him.

The US 3rd circuit court of appeals heard and rejected this argument in 2008. "Without Anton Geiser and other members of the SS Death's Head guard battalions, the Nazi concentration camp system could not have accomplished its diabolical objectives," said Eli M. Rosenbaum, Director of Human Rights Enforcement Strategy and Policy in the Human Rights and Special Prosecution Section (HRSP), echoing the court's opinion: "As an armed concentration camp guard in World War II, Geiser 'personally advocated or assisted in the persecution of a group of persons because of race, religion, or national origin.' RRA [Refugee Relief Act of 1953] § 14(a). Therefore, we will affirm the District Court's order granting the Government's motion for summary judgment and revoking Geiser's citizenship." The United States Supreme Court declined to hear Geiser's appeal in January 2009.

After Geiser exhausted his denaturalization appeals, the US government initiated deportation proceedings against him on April 1, 2009. A year later, on May 18, 2010, a US immigration judge ordered Geiser deported to Austria, the country from which he had immigrated. This order was not carried out, pending an appeal by Geiser, and he continued to reside in the United States. On December 6, 2012, Geiser's appeal was heard by the Board of Immigration Appeals, but Geiser himself did not attend the hearing, having been hospitalized with a broken leg sustained in a fall. Geiser died on December 21 before the BIA could issue a ruling on his appeal.
