= Immigration and Nationality =

Immigration and Nationality may refer to:

- Immigration and Nationality Act (disambiguation)
  - Immigration and Nationality Act of 1952
  - Immigration and Nationality Act of 1965
  - Immigration and Nationality Act Section 287(g)
- Immigration and Nationality Directorate
- Immigration and Nationality Law Review
