= Fedorchuk =

Fedorchuk (Ukrainian: Федорчук) is a surname of Ukrainian origin. It is associated with the given Christian name of Theodore and its derivatives may include Fedoruk and Fedorenko.

Notable people with the surname include:

- Dean Fedorchuk (born 1970), Canadian ice hockey coach
- Sergey Fedorchuk (born 1981), Ukrainian chess player
- Valeriy Fedorchuk (born 1988), Ukrainian footballer
- Vitaly Fedorchuk (1918–2008), Soviet political leader
