= Fedoruk =

Fedoruk (Ukrainian: Федорук) is a Ukrainian surname. It is the Ukrainian version of the son of Theodore, and may refer to:

- Mikhail Fedoruk, mathematician
- Mykola Fedoruk (1954–2025), Ukrainian politician, mayor of Chernivtsi
- Sylvia Fedoruk (1927–2012) Canadian scientist, curler and former Lieutenant Governor of Saskatchewan.
- Todd Fedoruk (born 1979), Canadian professional ice hockey player
- Valeriy Fedoruk (born 1983), Ukrainian squash player

== See also ==
- Fedorchuk
- Fedorenko
