= Feodor Fedorenko =

SS guard at a concentration camp and war criminal

- Fedоrenko at his civil trial in Florida (1978)
- Born: September 17, 1907; Dzhankoy, Taurida Governorate, Russian Empire
- Died: July 27, 1987 (aged 79); Crimean Oblast, Ukrainian SSR, Soviet Union
- Known for: Nazi collaborator and war criminal
- Status: Executed by shooting
- Convictions: Treason; War crimes
- Penalty: Death

Feodor Fedorenko (Note: Ukrainian: Федір Дем'янович Федоренко, romanized: Fedir Dem'ianovych Fedorenko; Russian: Фёдор Демьянович Федоренко, romanized: Fyodor Demyanovich Fedorenko) (September 17, 1907 – July 27, 1987) was a Soviet Nazi collaborator and war criminal who served at Treblinka extermination camp in German occupied Poland during World War II.

Fedorenko was born in Dzhankoy as a Soviet citizen. He was then conscripted into the Red Army in 1941 while working as a truck driver before being captured by the Wehrmacht and became a camp guard at Treblinka. After the German surrender, he moved to West Germany as a war refugee then admitted to the United States under a DPA visa (1949), Fedorenko became a naturalized U.S. citizen in 1970. His prior Nazi collaboration was discovered in 1977, leading to his naturalization being declared null and void in 1981 for having lied about his past in his documents. He was deported back to the Soviet Union in 1984 and sentenced to death for treason and participation in the Holocaust. Fedorenko was executed in 1987.

== Early life ==
Fedorenko was born in Dzhankoy, located in the Sivash region of the Crimea, then part of the Russian Empire.

== World War II ==
Fedorenko was conscripted into the Red Army in June 1941, around the time of the Nazi German Operation Barbarossa. He was a truck driver, and had no previous military training. Within two or three weeks, Fedorenko's group was encircled twice by the German army. He escaped the first time, but he was captured three days later by the Germans and transported to Zhytomyr, then Rivne, and finally to Chełm, Poland.

At the Chełm prisoner-of-war camp, German officers from Operation Reinhard recruited 200 to 300 captured Soviet soldiers for military training as auxiliary police in the service of Nazi Germany within General Government. They were sent to the Trawniki concentration camp SS training division, and Fedorenko was among them.

Fedorenko was one of approximately 5,000 Trawniki men trained as Holocaust executioners by SS-Hauptsturmführer Karl Streibel from Operation Reinhard. The Hiwi shooters, known in German as the Trawnikimänner, were deployed to all major killing sites of the Final Solution, augmented by the SS and Schupo, as well as Ordnungspolizei formations. The German Order Police performed roundups inside the Jewish ghettos in German-occupied Poland shooting everyone unable to move or attempting to flee, while the Trawnikis conducted large-scale civilian massacres in the same locations. It was their primary purpose of training. In the spring of 1942 Fedorenko was deployed from Trawniki to the Lublin Ghetto. It is known from historical record that between mid-March and mid-April 1942 over 30,000 Jews from Lublin Ghetto were transported to their deaths in cattle trucks at the Bełżec extermination camp and additional 4,000 at Majdanek. Fedorenko claimed in his postwar hearing that he was issued a rifle which was not fired. From Lublin, he was sent to the Warsaw Ghetto with his Sonderdienst battalion of 80 to 100 executioners. He was dispatched to Treblinka approximately in September 1942.

Fedorenko became a non-commissioned officer attaining the rank of Oberwacher. From September 1942 to August 1943, he led a 200-member ex-Soviet soldier detachment which shaved, stripped, beat and gassed prisoners brought to Treblinka.

The report of the Soviet Interrogation of Defendant Aleksandr Ivanovich Yeger (born in 1918, Germany), includes the section devoted to Fedorenko's activities at the Treblinka extermination camp in occupied Poland (excerpt).

FEDORENKO had the rank of an SS oberwachman. He was assistant to the commander of the first platoon of a guards company in the Treblinka "death camp". He came together with me from the city of Warsaw to the Treblinka "death camp". He took part in the shooting of citizens of Jewish nationality during the unloading of trains, in the undressing places to the gas chambers and to the "infirmary". At the end of 1943, he left for Danzig as part of a company of guards. I did not meet him again and do not know where he is now.— Yeger: Investigation Department of Ministry of State Security of the Ukraine.

== Escape to and life in the United States ==
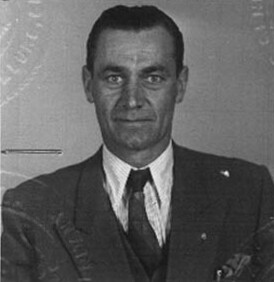
Feodor Fedorenko after his escape to the United States in 1949

After the end of the war, Fedorenko abandoned his wife and two children, who remained in the Soviet Union, and spent four years living as a war refugee in West Germany, working for the British from 1945 to 1949. Fedorenko emigrated to the United States from Hamburg in 1949 and was granted permanent residency status under the Displaced Persons Act. He initially resided in Philadelphia but later settled in Waterbury, Connecticut, where he found employment as a brass factory worker. Fedorenko would reside in Waterbury for the next two decades.

While Fedorenko's life in the United States was quiet, he had been identified as a possible war criminal. Treblinka survivors identified him as a guard at the camp from a collection of photographs and documents that had been captured from the SS. In the mid-sixties, Fedorenko's name and Waterbury, Connecticut, address were included on a list of fifty-nine war criminals living in America. The list was compiled in Europe and Israel and forwarded to the Immigration and Naturalization Service (INS) in the United States.

Fedorenko was granted U.S. citizenship in 1970, and later retired to Miami Beach, Florida in 1973. In the mid-1970s, Congressional Representatives Joshua Eilberg and Elizabeth Holtzman initiated a set of hearings that led the US Government Accountability Office (GAO) to investigate the handling of possible Nazi war criminal data. No mishandling was found, but as a result, a Special Litigation Unit for the investigation of Nazi war criminals was established in the INS. The information supplied in the sixties was now put to use. In 1977, the INS supplied information on Fedorenko to Justice Department prosecutors.

During his Soviet trial in 1986, his estranged wife Praskovya testified that he first resumed contact with her by post in 1961. He would send money to his two sons living in the Soviet Union, and visited his family in Crimea twice in the 1970s, as an American citizen on a tourist visa. At the time of the trial, the Soviet government provided no explanation as to why they had issued him a tourist visa and took no action against him during his stays in the country. On the other hand, a 2005 documentary produced for Russian state television, called Secrets of the Century – Punishers: May 9th (Russian: "Тайны века – Каратели: Девятое Мая"), alleges that during one of these visits in 1974, Fedorenko was in fact recognised and drew the interest of the KGB, and that it was the Soviet government who contacted the White House and requested that the case of Fedorenko be reviewed.

== Denaturalization trial and deportation ==
Fedorenko was arrested and, in June 1978, brought for a denaturalization trial in district court at Fort Lauderdale, Florida. He testified over three days, denying that he had actually entered the section of the camp where the gas chambers were located but admitted that he had once been posted on a guard tower overlooking this section of the camp. "I saw how they were loading up dead people, loading them on the stretchers. ... And they were loading them in a hole." Later in his testimony, he reconfirmed that this part of the camp "is where there was the workers that took the bodies and buried them or stacked them in the holes. This is where the gas chambers were." Concerning the unloading of Jews from the trains, he testified: "Some were picked for work and the others, they went to the gas chambers". Fedorenko argued that his service at Treblinka had been involuntary and, since he had worked only as a perimeter guard, he had virtually no contact with the prisoners. He had mistreated no one and, therefore, when he lied on his immigration forms about his birthplace and wartime service, it was not about any material fact that would have excluded him from entering the US."

Six Treblinka survivors, however, testified that Fedorenko had in fact committed atrocities, namely beating and shooting Jewish prisoners. Eugeun Turowski said he saw Fedorenko shoot and whip Jewish prisoners. Schalom Kohn said Fedorenko beat him almost daily with an iron-tipped whip, and that he saw him whip and shoot other prisoners. Josef Czarny said he saw Fedorenko beat arriving prisoners and shoot one prisoner. Gustaw Boraks said he saw Fedorenko chase prisoners to the gas chambers, beating them as they went. He also said that on one occasion, he heard a shot and ran outside to see Fedorenko, with a gun drawn, standing close to a wounded woman who later told him that Fedorenko was responsible for the shooting. Sonia Lewkowicz said she saw Fedorenko shoot a Jewish prisoner. Lastly, Pinchas Epstein said Fedorenko shot and killed a friend of his, after making him crawl naked on all fours.

Judge Norman C. Roettger ruled in favor of Fedorenko, saying the witnesses were unreliable. Three of them could not conclusively identify Fedorenko, and the other three, Roettger said, appeared to have been coached. He ruled that the 71-year-old Fedorenko had himself been a "victim of Nazi aggression" and that the prosecutors had failed to prove Fedorenko had committed any atrocities while serving as a guard at the extermination camp. Further, after entering the US, Fedorenko had been a hard-working and responsible resident and citizen. He could keep his US citizenship.

However, since this was a civil rather than a criminal case, the government could appeal the decision and chose to do so. Allan Ryan then of the Solicitor General's Office presented the appeal before the Fifth Circuit Court on behalf of the INS. He argued that Fedorenko's deception when entering the US was a material fact that justified revocation of citizenship, that the district court had erred in judging the credibility of the survivor witnesses, and that it erred in its determination that Fedorenko's good conduct in the US after the war was relevant to the decision about revoking his citizenship. The appellate court agreed and, in August 1979, reversed the district court's decision. Fedorenko appealed to the Supreme Court which, in January 1981, sustained the appellate court's decision. After losing his appeal, Fedorenko was taken into federal custody on December 10, 1984 and imprisoned at the Salem County Jail. With his 1970 naturalization having been declared null and void, he was deemed to have effectively remained a citizen of the Soviet Union, thereby facing deportation to that country. One of his American lawyers, Andrew Fylypovich of Philadelphia, said that his client apparently agreed to return to the Soviet Union, because he wanted to be reunited with his family, and because two prior visits to the USSR in the 1970s had convinced him that he would not be prosecuted. On the eve of his deportation, he reconsidered this, but found no other country willing to take him. Ultimately, Feodor Federenko was deported to his country of citizenship, the Soviet Union, on December 24, 1984.

== Soviet trial and execution ==
At the time of the deportation, Allan A. Ryan Jr., a former director of the DoJ's Office of Special Investigations, said Fedorenko's case was "likely to fall under an amnesty that the Soviet Union granted to some war criminals in the mid-1960s, and that that those who were convicted of war crimes tended to receive relatively light sentences, of five to eight years in prison". This contemporary appraisal is not fully correct, however. Although in 1955, there was indeed a sweeping amnesty along with a reduction of future sentences for Soviet citizens who had collaborated with German occupiers in the course of World War II, it did not apply to those who had murdered other Soviet citizens. This was only further confirmed in 1965 by two other decrees from the Supreme Soviet of the USSR, who again specified that the previous amnesties did not apply to anyone guilty of murder or torture of Soviet citizens, that there was no statute of limitations for these crimes, and that those convicted risk up to the death penalty.

In the Russian documentary Punishers, it was claimed that Fedorenko was not detained by the KGB upon arrival, and instead spent weeks drinking in his native Dzhankoy, walking free until his arrest in January 1985 after a piece titled "Nazi Fedorenko feels free in USSR" was reportedly published in The Washington Post. At the time, During his trial, Fedorenko's family disowned him, with his sons writing public letters denouncing him.

Fedorenko spent about a year in jail before his trial in the Crimean Regional Court began on June 10, 1986. The trial was open to the public, and the courtroom, designed to accommodate 500 people, was packed. Upon hearing the indictment, people in the audience were outraged and said they wanted to "tear apart" Fedorenko. Surviving witnesses implicated him in numerous atrocities. Fedorenko claimed that "Jews were among my best friends, both in the Soviet Union and later." He denied any violent acts, with the exception of two executions which he claimed were justified.

The prosecutor was adamant that Fedorenko should be executed, while his lawyer asked the court for leniency on the grounds of his client's age. The court found that approximately 800,000 people were killed during Fedorenko's time in Treblinka. The trial lasted nine days, with Judge Mikhail Tyutyunnik sentencing Fedorenko to death on June 19, 1986. He was also ordered to forfeit all of his belongings. Upon hearing the verdict and sentence, the audience broke into loud applause. In Punishers, it was reported that Fedorenko, in tears, told the courtroom "I didn't want this" in his last statement, but displayed a lack of emotion upon the reading of the final verdict. A subsequent appeal to the Supreme Court of the USSR was rejected, and his execution by firing squad was announced on July 27, 1987.

== See also ==
- John Demjanjuk
- Karl Linnas
- Algimantas Dailidė
- Anton Geiser
- Boļeslavs Maikovskis
