= Fedorenko v. United States =

- Supreme Court of the United States

Argued October 15, 1980 Decided January 21, 1981
- Full case name: Feodor Fedorenko v. United States
- Citations: 449 U.S. 490 (more) 101 S. Ct. 737; 66 L. Ed. 2d 686

Case history
- Prior: Certiorari to the United States Court of Appeals for the Fifth Circuit

Holding
- As a person who had assisted the enemy in persecuting civilians, Fedorenko's visa was illegally procured and therefore his citizenship must be revoked under the Immigration and Nationality Act of 1952.

Court membership
- Chief Justice Warren E. Burger Associate Justices William J. Brennan Jr. · Potter Stewart; Byron White · Thurgood Marshall; Harry Blackmun · Lewis F. Powell Jr. William Rehnquist · John P. Stevens

Case opinions
- Majority: Marshall, joined by Brennan, Stewart, Powell, Rehnquist
- Concurrence: Burger
- Concurrence: Blackmun
- Dissent: White
- Dissent: Stevens

Fedorenko v. United States, 449 U.S. 490 (1981), is a decision of the Supreme Court of the United States on the citizenship status of Feodor Fedorenko, a naturalized citizen who had lied about his past as a guard at a Nazi death camp on his visa and citizenship applications. The court held that because Fedorenko lied on his visa application, his visa and citizenship were invalid. Fedorenko was a Ukrainian-born soldier who fought in World War II, was captured, and served as a guard at Treblinka extermination camp for over a year. He emigrated to the United States in 1949, lying on his visa application to cover up his time at Treblinka. He lived a quiet life in the U.S. for decades, but when the government became aware of his past, they initiated denaturalization proceedings against him in 1977, looking to revoke his citizenship. As a result of Fedorenko's eventual loss, he was deported to the Soviet Union and executed for treason and war crimes.

Fedorenko was one of many Nazi collaborators living quietly in the United States after World War II; at the public's urging, the government started investigating in the early '70s, but they were slow and ineffective, and when they filed suit to denaturalize Fedorenko, they did not properly prepare for trial. The District Court for the Southern District of Florida ruled for Fedorenko, but the government – by then under better management – won at the Fifth Circuit Court of Appeals, which ordered Fedorenko's citizenship to be revoked. Justice Thurgood Marshall, writing for a 7–2 Supreme Court majority, upheld the appeals court's judgment, but did not endorse all of its reasoning.

The government argued that Fedorenko's citizenship should be revoked because it was gained "by concealment of a material fact"; the immigration law that Fedorenko used to enter the U.S. did not allow people who "assisted the enemy in persecuting civil populations", so if Fedorenko had not lied about his past as a guard, he could have been denied entry. Fedorenko offered three defenses, based on duress, materiality, and equity. First, Fedorenko argued that the immigration law did not exclude him because he only served as a guard under duress; the district court accepted this argument, but the Supreme Court held that the law had no exception for duress. Second, Fedorenko argued that because he was forced to be a guard, his lie was immaterial under the court's ruling in Chaunt v. United States (1960); he would have been let in either way. The government argued that Chaunt should be interpreted differently – an issue lower courts had disagreed on in the past – but the Supreme Court avoided answering the Chaunt question, holding that because Fedorenko helped persecute civilians, he was ineligible, so his lie was material. Third, the district court held that under the rules of equity, it had the power to rule for Fedorenko anyway because of his record of a quiet life in the U.S.; the Supreme Court disagreed, ruling that if citizenship is gained illegally, the court has no power to stop denaturalization.

The Supreme Court's holding in this case helped the government in its other cases against suspected Nazi collaborators. However, the court was criticized for sidestepping the ambiguity of Chaunt rather than clarifying it. Scholars split on the issue of duress; some pointed to the district court's holding that if duress was not an exception, the act would bar Jewish kapos from entry, while others agreed with the Supreme Court in finding that argument unconvincing. Justice Harry Blackmun concurred with the decision, but argued that the court should have applied Chaunt to the case. Two justices dissented; Justice John Paul Stevens argued against the court's interpretation of duress, while Justice Byron White argued that the court should have clarified Chaunt and remanded the case back to the appeals court to review the district court's findings. After Fedorenko's loss at the Supreme Court, he was deported to the Soviet Union in 1984; there, he pled guilty to war crimes in 1986 and was executed in 1987.

== Background ==
=== Case ===
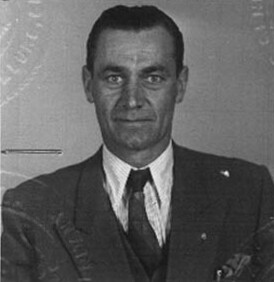
Feodor Fedorenko after his escape to the United States in 1949

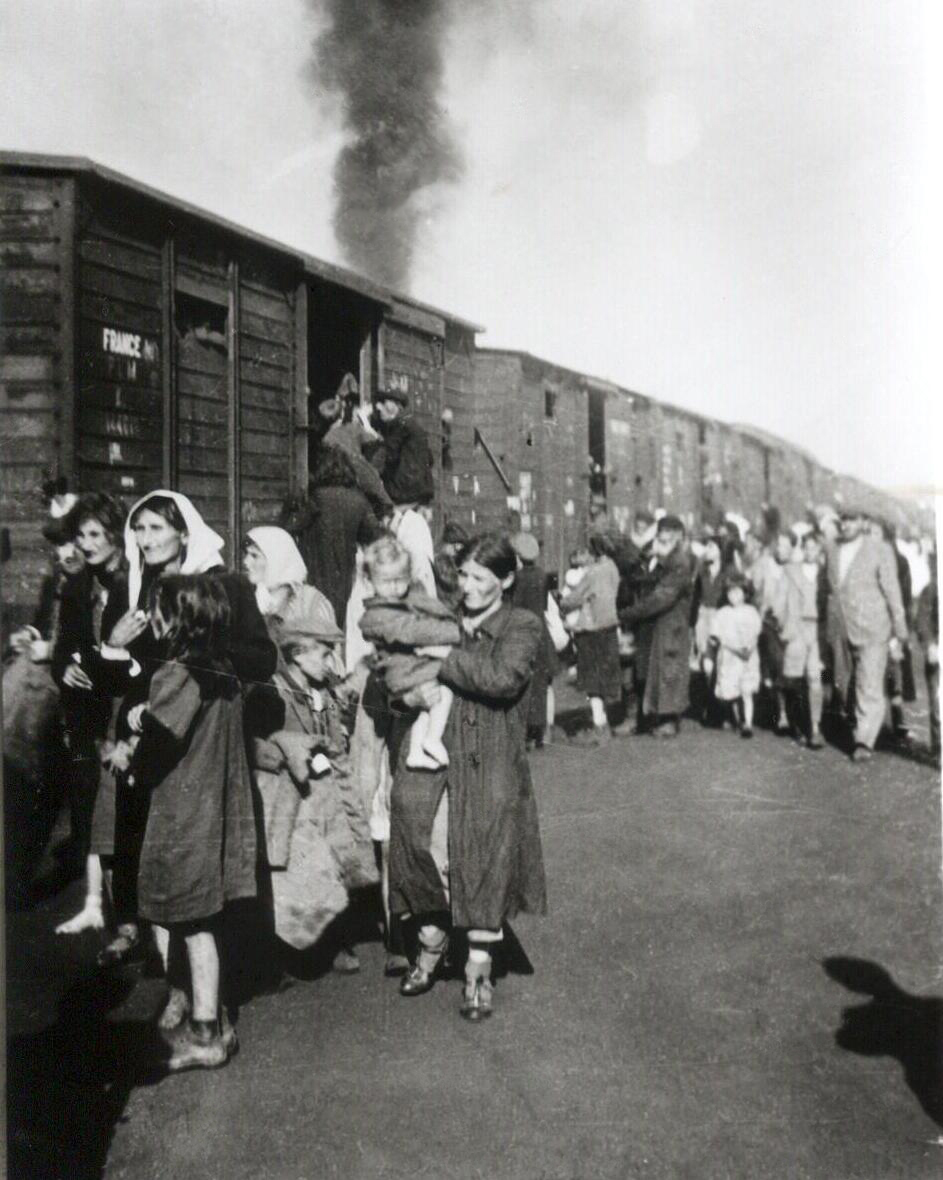
Jews being deported to Treblinka extermination camp, 1942

The aftermath of World War II saw many attempts by the United States and other Allied countries to resettle a large number of people who were displaced or made refugees by the war. In 1948, the United States government passed the Displaced Persons Act (DPA), which allowed a large number of war refugees to enter without counting towards their country's immigration quota. While the act made it easier for most refugees to enter, it did not cover all refugees; borrowing language from constitution of the International Refugee Organization, the act gave no help to:

1. War criminals, quislings, and traitors.
2. Any other persons who can be shown:
  (a) to have assisted the enemy in persecuting civil populations of countries, Members of the United Nations; or
  (b) to have voluntarily assisted the enemy forces since the outbreak of the second world war in their operations against the United Nations.

One person who came to the United States through the DPA was Feodor Fedorenko, a Ukrainian-born citizen of the Soviet Union. Fedorenko was drafted into the Red Army after Nazi Germany invaded the country in June 1941; within a month of being mobilized, he was captured by the Nazis. After moving through several prisoner of war (PoW) camps, Fedorenko was trained in early 1942 to be a guard. He was transferred to work at the Treblinka extermination camp in September 1942 and did so until an uprising closed the camp in August 1943. He then served as a guard at a PoW camp in Pölitz, and then as a warehouse guard in Hamburg. Before the British entered Hamburg in 1945, Fedorenko left the service of the Nazis and did civilian labor work until 1949.

Fedorenko applied to enter U.S. through the DPA in 1949, falsely claiming that he was from Poland and that he had spent the war working as a farmer there, and then as a factory worker in Pölitz. He claimed that he served in a "labor battalion"; the DPA would have required an investigation to determine whether or not he was a voluntary collaborator with the Nazis, but there is no evidence that such an investigation occurred. After six weeks, Fedorenko's application was granted. He lived a quiet life in the U.S. for the next 28 years, staying briefly in Philadelphia before moving to Waterbury, Connecticut to work in a factory. In 1969, he applied for U.S. citizenship, again hiding his time at Treblinka extermination camp; the Immigration and Naturalization Service (INS) recommended Fedorenko be naturalized, and he received U.S. citizenship in 1970. He retired to Miami Beach, Florida, in 1976. In all of his time in the United States before being discovered, his only brush with the law was a parking ticket.

Meanwhile, the American public was slowly becoming aware that Nazis and collaborators were hiding in the United States, with high-profile cases such as Hermine Braunsteiner coming to light in the 1960s and '70s. Two members of Congress, Joshua Eilberg and Elizabeth Holtzman, started drawing attention to the issue, pressing the government to root out domestic war criminals. As early as 1964, Fedorenko's name was on a list of 59 suspected war criminals compiled by a man named Otto Karbach. In 1973, he gave the list to the INS; (Note: Criminal war crime charges were generally thought to be out of the question in the United States, as the legal consensus was that such a case would violate the Ex Post Facto Clause. Thus, the INS's prevailing strategy was to deport criminals to countries who would be willing to prosecute.) this, as well as pressure from Eilberg and Holtzman, led the INS to create an "office" to investigate the charges. The office consisted of exactly one man, Sam Zutty, a career INS investigator. He worked with Israeli police to find survivors who could identify the people in question; this led to mixed results. One 76-year-old survivor named Eugun Turkowski insisted that one man in a spread of photographs was Fedorenko when it was actually John Demjanjuk. Zutty's office proved on the whole to be largely ineffective, filing no cases for the first three years of the task force. In response to a January 1977 letter from Holtzman's subcommittee, the Government Accountability Office found that while there was no conspiracy to protect Nazis from investigation, the INS had proved incompetent to investigate the allegations before it.

Finally, looking to alleviate pressure, the government (Note: Exactly who handled and initiated Fedorenko's prosecution in the district court is disputed. Some claim that it was initiated by Zutty's office and transferred to the special litigation unit; others claim that the INS gave the case to the Department of Justice; still others claim that the special litigation unit's involvement was limited at best, yet it still received most of the blame for the case's early results.) brought denaturalization proceedings against Fedorenko and nine other suspected war criminals from late 1976 through 1977, filing Fedorenko's in 1977. The government, however, proved to be wholly unprepared for trial; it had located no domestic witnesses, had not prepared the witnesses it did have for trial, did not interview its elderly witnesses (instead hoping that they would survive long enough to take the stand in court), and was not familiar with court standards for photographic identification. Days before the commissioner of the INS was set to testify before Eilberg's subcommittee in July 1977, Zutty's office was dissolved and replaced with a special litigation unit. The special litigation unit brought no new cases, but the government proceeded with five of these cases post-reorganization, and Fedorenko's case went to trial.

=== Denaturalization and materiality ===
In Article I of the U.S. Constitution, Congress is given the power "to establish an uniform Rule of Naturalization". Using this power, Congress passed the Naturalization Act of 1906, which allowed the government to revoke a person's citizenship, a process called denaturalization, in cases of fraud or where the citizenship was "illegally procured". The Supreme Court upheld the constitutionality of that law as a part of its ruling in Johannessen v. United States (1912). In 1952, Congress replaced the law, instead allowing denaturalization in cases where citizenship is taken "by concealment of a material fact or by willful misrepresentation"; the "illegal procurement" language was restored in 1961.

Lower courts, however, could not make a uniform standard for materiality, often disagreeing on whether certain facts in a case should be considered material or not. The Supreme Court ruled in Johannssen that a fact is material if the government would not have granted citizenship had they known that fact, but lower courts ruled differently on less obvious cases. Some courts held that hiding something solely to avoid an investigation should be enough to revoke citizenship if that investigation could have turned up more relevant evidence. Often, courts would lump various denaturalization criteria together or reference them vaguely.

The Supreme Court tried to clarify the standard of materiality in Chaunt v. United States (1960) by creating a two-pronged test; under the test, a fact is material if it meets the requirements of either prong. The first prong matched Johannssen's standard that a fact is material if it would have been disqualifying, while the second prong covered facts where "disclosure might have been useful in an investigation possibly leading to the discovery of other facts warranting denial of citizenship". This second prong seemingly struck a balance between the lower courts; hiding something to avoid the possibility of an investigation could be grounds for denaturalization, but not always.

Chaunt failed to end the debate; lower courts disagreed on how to interpret the decision, leading to a circuit split between the Ninth and Second Circuit Courts of Appeals. In United States v. Rossi (1962) and La Madrid-Peraza v. INS (1974), the Ninth Circuit held that the second prong of Chaunt still required the government to show that the facts discovered on a potential investigation would have caused the denial of citizenship. Rossi was also one of many cases where a court extended the definition of materiality to visa applications, not just citizenship cases. The Second Circuit disagreed, holding in United States v. Oddo (1963) that the second prong only required the government to show that a potential investigation could conceivably have turned up more relevant information.

==== Equity ====
Civil denaturalization cases are decided by courts sitting in equity rather than common law, meaning the judge decides the facts of the case without a jury and may use their discretion to promote fairness in outcome rather than strict compliance with law. (Note: The U.S. government can also seek denaturalization through an indictment in criminal court under 18 U.S.C § 1425. See Maslenjak v. United States, 582 U.S. 335.) This categorization of denaturalization cases dates back to the District Court for the Southern District of New York's ruling in Mansour v. United States (1908); the court held that denaturalization cases are analogous to suits to cancel a government-given grant or patent, which are treated as suits in equity, and that denaturalization cases should be decided similarly. The Supreme Court agreed with this reasoning in Luria v. United States (1913) without citing Mansour.

Because the Naturalization Act was meant to help courts address widespread fraud committed by state officials, courts erred on the side of ordering denaturalization even for minor errors. For example, in United States v. Ginsberg (1917), the Supreme Court held that a naturalization judge staging the final hearing in their chambers rather than an open courtroom invalidated the proceedings, while in Maney v. United States (1928), it held that a certificate of lawful arrival reaching the court three weeks later than the application for citizenship was an incurable procedural defect. In these cases, the court held that it was the responsibility of the applicant to meet all requirements for citizenship and that the law did not allow for equitable discretion. However, courts' pattern of liberally ordering denaturalization changed somewhat in Schneiderman v. United States (1943), in which the court held that it was the government's responsibility to provide "clear, unequivocal, and convincing" evidence in favor of denaturalization, a high bar that approached the "beyond a reasonable doubt" standard of criminal law. The court also later held in Knauer v. United States (1946) that naturalized citizens enjoy all of the same rights and privileges as citizens by birth.

== Lower courts ==
=== District court ===
==== Trial ====
The government was represented by four lawyers, led by the chief assistant U.S. district attorney, John Sale. Fedorenko was represented by Gregg Pomeroy, a lawyer who had served in the local public defender's office but was in private practice by then. The presiding judge was Norman Charles Roettger Jr. of the United States District Court for the Southern District of Florida.

The government called six survivors of Treblinka to the witness stand, all of Israeli citizenship. Their names were Eugun Turkowski, Shalom Kohn, Josef Czarny, Gustaw Boraks, Sonia Lewkowicz, and Pincas Epstein. Five of the six said that they had seen Fedorenko beat, whip, and/or shoot Jews during their time in Treblinka and recounted those stories; Kohn claimed that Fedorenko personally beat him. Czarny presented more circumstantial evidence, and he admitted on cross-examination that he had not specifically seen Fedorenko commit the acts he was detailing. The witnesses variously claimed that they had seen or heard of Fedorenko shooting prisoners in and out of the Lazarett (a pit where prisoners were commonly shot if they could not be taken to the gas chambers), carrying a pistol or a whip, beating Jews as they exited the train, and chasing prisoners with a whip. In one provocative example, Pincas Epstein claimed that he had seen Fedorenko shoot a prisoner who was naked on his hands and knees next to the mass grave of the gas chambers, a man Epstein knew from his hometown. On cross-examination of Turkowski and Kohn, Gregg Pomeroy emphasized the involuntary nature of the work they had done at Treblinka, looking to bolster his own argument that Fedorenko had served under duress.

Identification of Fedorenko was somewhat trickier: when asked to point to Fedorenko in the room, Turkowski incorrectly identified an elderly man in the spectators' section. The courtroom identification was not strictly necessary; Fedorenko's initial application had been admitted into evidence, and the witness correctly identified Fedorenko in the photograph in court. However, it did damage the government's case. Kohn correctly identified Fedorenko in the room; Czarny, Boraks, and Epstein had correctly identified an earlier picture of Fedorenko from a photo spread shown to them in Israel.

The government called two expert witnesses to supplement its case as well. The first was Kenmore Jenkins, a former Foreign Service officer who issued DPA visas as part of his work in Munich. While he was not personally familiar with Fedorenko, he was an expert as to the in-practice implementation of the DPA immediately following World War II. His most important role came when he testified that, whether voluntary or not, disclosing his service as a guard would have disqualified Fedorenko. The second expert witness, and the final overall, was Harry Zimon, the government worker who handled Fedorenko's citizenship application. He also testified that had he known of Fedorenko's time at Treblinka, he would not have recommended his naturalization. On cross-examination, Zimon admitted that Fedorenko claimed to be Ukrainian on his citizenship application and Polish on his visa application, but he did not investigate the discrepancy. After Zimon's testimony, the government rested its case and moved for summary judgment. The motion was denied.

Fedorenko's defense consisted of three character witnesses and his own testimony. All three of the witnesses testified in favor of Fedorenko's good moral character. One of those witnesses, Nadia Huczar, also testified that many Ukrainians in American or British territory had committed suicide rather than accept deportation to the Soviet Union, fearing it could come with exile to Siberia. Fedorenko's own testimony consisted mostly of distancing himself from the atrocities that the government's witnesses said they saw him commit. He denied ever being given a whip, seeing anyone die in the Lazarett, going near the gas chambers, whipping or shooting anybody, or seeing a Jew being forced to undress upon arrival. He admitted to being given a pistol and shooting at escaping prisoners during the uprising, although he claimed to have never hit anyone. After the lawyers finished questioning Fedorenko, Roettger asked Fedorenko to look him in the eye and – in asking whether he committed any of the atrocities the witnesses claimed to have saw him commit – say da or nyet, to which Fedorenko looked him in the eye and responded "nyet". At this point, the judge announced that he did not need to hear the testimony of six Soviet guards the defense intended to call, a move the government correctly interpreted as favoring the defense.

==== Ruling ====
The district court ruled for Fedorenko, rejecting the testimony of the Treblinka survivors and Jenkins. Roettger found the photographic spread to be constitutionally invalid for identification, as the photograph containing Fedorenko was clearer and bigger than its neighbors, and the spread contained as few as three photos for some of the witnesses. The in-court identification was also ruled invalid, as the court speculated that the two witnesses who correctly pointed out Fedorenko may have been coached following Turkowski's gaffe. The court, therefore, found that the witnesses' testimony mostly could not be considered and that the government had not satisfactorily proved that Fedorenko had willingly committed any atrocities that would disqualify him.

On Jenkins's testimony and the question of materiality, the court rejected the government's argument for a broad interpretation of Chaunt, instead interpreting the second prong to mean that a misrepresentation can be considered material only where the investigation in question would have revealed disqualifying facts. Roettger reasoned, relying on the Ninth Circuit, that an investigation at the time would have found that Fedorenko was forced to work as a guard at Treblinka and would have admitted him. Fedorenko might have been disqualified on the plain language of the DPA – the disqualifying clause, section 2(a), does not explicitly contain an exemption for duress, while section 2(b) does – but the court ruled that if the persecution clause did not have a duress exemption, it would be forced to deny entry to kapos, an unjust result that necessitated the existence of a voluntariness standard. Finally, the court asserted that it had discretion as a court in equity to rule for Fedorenko, given his nearly three decades living in the United States with a near-spotless record in that time. Citing the evidence presented in support of Fedorenko's character, including being viewed positively by people around him, Roettger found that his power to make sure the case had a fair outcome – regardless of the law – extended to ruling to preserve his citizenship.

=== Appeals court ===
Following the embarrassing performance in this case and others, the special litigation unit was reorganized into the Office of Special Investigations (OSI) under the Department of Justice, which greatly expanded its budget and capabilities. Under OSI management, The government appealed the district court's ruling to the Fifth Circuit Court of Appeals, disputing the decision with respect to materiality, equitable discretion, and reliability of witness testimony. On June 28, 1979, writing for a three-judge panel, John Minor Wisdom reversed the district court's ruling on the first two grounds. The third was ignored, as the first two were deemed sufficient to reverse. With regards to materiality, the Fifth Circuit followed the Second Circuit's path in the split on Chaunt, ruling that since a disclosure might have caused the government to find facts worth denying citizenship, the misrepresentation was material. The court reasoned that following the Ninth Circuit would require the government to investigate and conclusively discover disqualifying facts, and then prove them against a high standard of evidence. The court reasoned that such a barrier would be too difficult for the government to meet, incentivizing applicants to misrepresent their cases.

The appeals court also ruled that the district court erred in using equitable discretion to justify ruling for Fedorenko, holding that it had no discretion to deny denaturalization:

There is a crucial distinction between a district court's authority to grant citizenship and its authority to revoke citizenship. In the former situation, the court must consider facts and circumstances relevant to determining whether an individual meets such requirements for naturalization as good moral character and an understanding of the English language, basic American history, and civics. The district courts must be accorded some discretion to make these determinations. Once it has been determined that a person does not qualify for citizenship, however, the district court has no discretion to ignore the defect and grant citizenship. The denaturalization statute does not accord the district courts any authority to excuse the fraudulent procurement of citizenship.

The appeals court ordered that Fedorenko's citizenship be revoked. The Supreme Court granted a writ of certiorari to consider whether Fedorenko's citizenship was cancellable on statutory grounds and whether equitable discretion could counteract that. Benjamin Civiletti argued the government's case before the court, his only oral argument delivered while serving as the Attorney General.

== Supreme Court ==
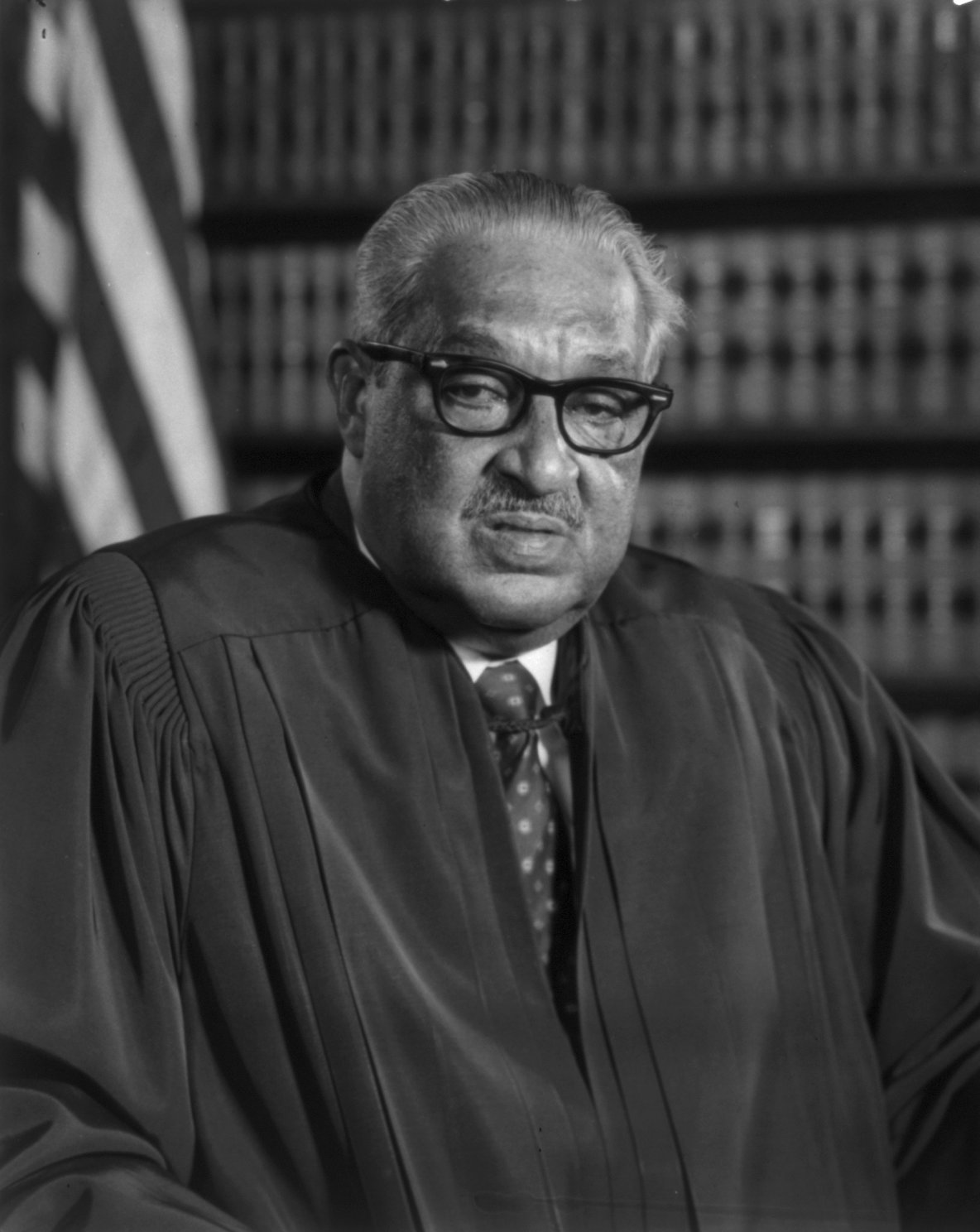
Thurgood Marshall wrote the opinion of the Supreme Court.

Writing for the majority on January 21, 1981, Justice Thurgood Marshall affirmed the appeals court's judgment but not its rationale. The court distinguished Chaunt from automatic application to this case, as that case concerned misrepresentations on a citizenship application about events occurring after the visa was granted. This case, on the other hand, concerned misrepresentations made on the visa application about events occurring prior to entry. The court determined that it would be appropriate to decide whether the misrepresentation test created in Chaunt applied to visa applications, but it then dismissed the question as pragmatically unnecessary by negating Fedorenko's procurement of his visa.

In defining a new minimum standard of materiality for visa applications, the court held that "at the very least, a misrepresentation must be considered material if disclosure of the true facts would have made the applicant ineligible for a visa." It then held that under the plain language of the act and Jenkins' testimony, Fedorenko was ineligible for his visa, rejecting the district court's interpretation of the voluntariness standards in the DPA. Since Section 2(a) did not contain an exemption for duress, while Section 2(b) did, the court held that it did not have to consider duress in its construction of 2(a). The court ruled that Fedorenko's involvement under the act was enough to be disqualified under 2(a), whereas a Jewish inmate forced to cut the hair of other inmates in preparation for execution would not qualify. It deferred the question of kapos to a future case. Despite the district court's finding that Fedorenko's service was not voluntary, he was ineligible for his visa at the time he applied, and thus his misrepresentation was material.

From there, the court concluded that Fedorenko's citizenship must be revoked as well; the DPA required that persons admitted under the act comply with all immigration laws in force. The Immigration and Nationality Act of 1952 provided that applicants for citizenship needed to have been approved for permanent residence, which is impossible without a valid visa. Since Fedorenko's visa was invalid, his citizenship was deemed "illegally procured" and thus revocable. On the issue of equitable discretion, the court affirmed the appeals court's decision, holding that while equity can be used to emphasize or deemphasize facts in a naturalization case, the district court judge had no power to use equity in determining the result of a denaturalization case. Chief Justice Warren E. Burger concurred in the judgment, but he did not file an opinion.

=== Other opinions ===
Justice Harry Blackmun concurred, but he said that the majority should have applied Chaunt to the case because he thought that facts used to distinguish Chaunt were insignificant. He reasoned that had Chaunt been applied, its first prong would have had the same effect of disqualifying Fedorenko based on the testimony of Jenkins; the facts, if discovered, would have led to denial of a visa. He also noted that lower courts had been consistently applying Chaunt to visa applications. On the second prong of Chaunt, Blackmun defended the district court's view that the misrepresented facts would have to lead to the discovery of materially disqualifying truths. He argued that if every misrepresentation was subject to scrutiny on the basis that it might have led to the discovery of disqualifying facts, then naturalized citizenship was made too vulnerable and easily revoked when it should be equal to that of a natural-born citizen.

Justice John Paul Stevens dissented, writing that the court acted on a "theory that no litigant argued, that the Government expressly disavowed". Regarding the DPA, Stevens agreed with the district court's rejection of the voluntariness distinction between 2(a) and 2(b). He contended that despite 2(a) containing a duress exception and 2(b) not, 2(a) certainly had to incorporate a distinction of duress regardless; otherwise, it would disqualify Jewish kapos, a result he felt was unacceptable. On the issue of Chaunt, he echoed the view that the government should have to prove that a misrepresentation stymied discovery of disqualifying facts to show materiality. He concluded that what he saw as the court's error would cause "human suffering".

Justice Byron White also dissented, arguing that rather than relying on the DPA, the court should have clarified the Chaunt standard and remanded the case to the appeals court to review the district court's findings. He agreed with the majority's ambivalence on whether or not to apply Chaunt to visa applications, but he also noted that the appeals court failed to review the district court's use of Chaunt on Fedorenko's citizenship application. White agreed with the appeals court's interpretation of Chaunt more than the district court's. However, he disagreed with the Supreme Court's interpretation of the DPA, arguing that a voluntariness standard might well be contained in the use of the words "assist" and "persecute" in the DPA, which would have influenced the outcome of the case.

== Aftermath ==
Following the Supreme Court's ruling, Fedorenko was subject to deportation proceedings. The Board of Immigration Appeals refused to make a duress exemption for him, and Fedorenko was thus ordered to leave the country. On December 21, 1984, after being refused by Canada, Fedorenko was deported to the Soviet Union. In 1986, he pled guilty at trial and received a death sentence. On July 28, 1987, the Soviet Union announced that it had executed him. The director of the Anti-Defamation League told The New York Times that "justice was delayed but finally served", and Michael Bazyler and Frank Tuerkheimer wrote in their book that "the inescapable fundamental fact is that he played a part in a horrendous killing machine that probably murdered several hundred thousand persons on his watch."

Fedorenko v. United States had several important effects on future trials. It established that suspected war criminals would not be able to escape the charges by claiming duress; when John Demjanjuk's trial began a month later, he claimed, unlike Fedorenko, that he had never worked at any Nazi concentration camp at all. In addition, because the Supreme Court did not make a distinction between a concentration camp and a death camp in ruling against Fedorenko, future cases were made easier by establishing that working at a concentration camp was sufficient. The Fedorenko case also dampened future denaturalization efforts because the participating witnesses felt denigrated by the district judge, which made them reluctant to participate in cases such as Demjanjuk's. The Eighth Circuit has cited this case to similarly reject a duress exemption for gang-affiliated crimes committed by minors.

Gerald A. Wunsch, writing in the Immigration and Nationality Law Review, criticized the Fifth Circuit and Supreme Court for their treatment of equitable discretion. He contended that their approaches essentially excised all equitable discretion from a proceeding that is nominally carried out in equity. Wunsch further argued that the district court was correct to exercise discretion in its ruling, but he recognized that there were limits on equitable discretion that the district court ignored.

Several scholars criticized the court for sidestepping clarification of Chaunt. Abbe L. Dienstag called it a "neat trick of statutory interpretation" in the Columbia Law Review; Diane Goffer Bylciw wrote for the New York Law School Law Review that Fedorenko "may be remembered more for what it failed to decide than what it actually decided"; and Wunsch and Bylciw lamented that this decision left the circuit split in force. The Eastern District of Pennsylvania District Court noted the same failure in United States v. Osidach, choosing to instead resolve its case on the same "illegal procurement" test that the Fedorenko court had, as did the court in United States v. Demjanjuk. Jann M. Parker, writing in the Connecticut Law Review, suggested requiring the government to prove that a misrepresentation would have led to an investigation, but then requiring the applicant to prove that the investigation would not have found disqualifying facts. Patricia A. Binder criticized the court's refusal to extend Chaunt to visa applications, finding the reasoning unconvincing.

Dienstag argued that the court should not have dismissed Fedorenko's duress defense in their ruling. He dismissed the statutory construction by which the court moved the issue aside, arguing that such a construction was not the necessary consequence of the language and that other readings were possible. He argued that the defense of duress should be allowed, but the burden of proof should be on the defendant. Bazyler and Tuerkheimer also discussed duress, arguing that Fedorenko may have had good odds of escaping while on leave, thus rendering his service voluntary. On the broader subject, Bylciw wrote that while the question of kapos was practically becoming more moot over time, the theoretical question of interpretation still remained. Lawrence Douglas wrote in a 2016 book that he disliked Roettger's and Stevens' analysis of the duress question, as he saw it as morally equating kapos with guards such as Fedorenko.
