= Selci Đakovački =

- Village (Selo)
- Location within Osijek-Baranja County Location within Croatia Location within Europe
- Country: Croatia

Government
  - Mayor: Unknown

Area
  - Total: 11.5 sq mi (29.7 km^{2})

Population (2021)
  - Total: 1,412
  - Density: 123/sq mi (47.5/km^{2})
- Time zone: UTC+1 (CET)
  - Summer (DST): UTC+2 (CEST)
- Postal code: 31415
- Area code: +385 832
- Vehicle registration: DJ

Selci Đakovački is a village in Croatia. It is connected by the D38 highway.

The local sport clubs include the football club NK Omladinac.
