= Archaeology of the Holocaust =

The archaeology of the Holocaust is the study of material remains linked to the Holocaust. This research was initiated at Nazi extermination camps in Central Europe, but has since been applied across Europe in locations linked to Nazi atrocities and war crimes, as well as in locations where Jewish life and culture was affected during World War II.

== Development ==
Study of the Holocaust is particular within archaeology as it covers an event of the modern period, and began when persons with direct experience of the events studied were still alive. Although Nazi extermination camps were captured and liberated by the Soviet Red Army in 1943-1945 on the Eastern Front of World War II, the full extent of the Holocaust was obscured by attempts to hide and disguise evidence of mass murder.

Judicial investigations linked to the trials for crimes against humanity of Nazis and collaborators studied material evidence of the Holocaust in the 1940s. However these were not performed using archaeological methods and techniques. While some sites linked to the Holocaust and Nazi war crimes have been designated memorials or museums, Caroline Sturdy Colls estimated in 2011 that "the majority [of sites of the Holocaust] have not been examined archaeologically".

In the late 1980s, archaeological methods were applied at the site of the Chelmno extermination camp by museum curator Pawlicka-Nowak. These studies identified previously unknown human remains of victims which were not cremated during the camp's destruction. These findings led to similar research being performed at other extermination and concentration camps starting in the 1990s, as well as the archaeological study of sites related to Jewish life and culture during World War II.

== Challenges and ethical considerations ==
The archaeology of the Holocaust presents unique challenges as a study of a recent event with significant historical and judicial record. In this field, ethical practice requires conducting scientific investigations in a manner that takes into consideration the needs and wishes of diverse stakeholders, including survivors, relatives of the victims, religious groups, and governments.

A primary ethical challenge within Holocaust archaeology involves respecting Halakha (Jewish law), which prohibits the disturbance of Jewish graves unless it is under threat, centering on the belief that a grave is eternally tied to the soul of the deceased. This religious law applies to all graves, regardless of whether they were created legally or illegally as was the case in the Holocaust. Because Halakha also prohibits scientific analyses of the deceased, researchers often face limitations in their abilities to investigate many Holocaust sites, leading to disagreements between archaeologists, religious groups, governments, survivors, and family members of the deceased. Further, since archaeological practices often center on excavation, new archaeological methods were developed for Holocaust archaeology. These prioritize non-invasive techniques (as described in the next section), allowing archaeologies to thoroughly investigate Holocaust sites while still adhering to Halakha.

Beyond religious considerations, archaeologists have the ethical obligation to treat victims of violence and all deceased persons with dignity. At sites of mass atrocities, archaeologists are also responsible for helping to uncover evidence of crimes and informing their surviving relatives, ensuring the victims are remembered with respect. Holocaust archaeology also provides a means of public education, documenting crimes against humanity to ensure they are recognized by the world.

== Methods ==
Holocaust archaeology employs an interdisciplinary approach with a focus on non-invasive methods, which offer the potential to examine large areas at high levels of detail and serve as a valuable precursor to excavation when it is needed. Methods are selected on a case-by-case basis, based on the nature of the site under investigation and the specific circumstances in which the work is being undertaken. Prior to any fieldwork, researchers integrate archival research, historical maps, survivor testimony, and geographic information systems (GIS) to reconstruct site layouts and identify areas of interest. These approaches allow archaeologists to correlate physical evidence with documentary sources and better understand the spatial organization of extermination and concentration camps.

On site, a variety of above-ground, non-invasive methods are used. Walkover surveys are typically conducted prior to other in-field survey methods to identify and record visible features, often leading to the discovery of previously unrecorded features in Holocaust sites. Light Detection and Ranging (LiDAR) is used to generate high-resolution digital terrain models, allowing archaeologists to rapidly identify surface features such as depressions associated with buried remains or remnants of former camp infrastructure that may not be visible at the ground level, even in densely vegetated sites. Unmanned Aerial Vehicles (UAVs, or drones) are a cost-effective means of collecting aerial imagery and monitoring Holocaust site conditions over time and are frequently used in conservation strategies.

Other above-ground methods include forensic archaeological search techniques, adapted from crime scene investigation practices, are used to locate mass graves, cremation pits, and other body disposal areas in Holocaust sites. Global Positioning System (GPS) and total station surveys are used for precise spatial recording, while laser scanning and the less-expensive multi-photo photogrammetry are used to record above-ground remains by creating detailed three-dimensional models of landscapes, structures, and artifacts found at Holocaust sites. Building recording further documents Holocaust structures that remain fully or partially standing, preserving information about the building’s function and providing the opportunity to identify evidence concealed within the construction.

After a thorough assessment of above-ground evidence utilizing the non-invasive methods described, a series of below-ground methods may be employed where appropriate. Because a lot of the evidence of the Holocaust was deliberately concealed or altered, it is crucial to assess buried remains while adhering to ethical and religious considerations. This often begins with geophysical surveys instead of excavation, which are considered the more practical and ethical approach for investigating Holocaust sites since they are non-invasive and thus do not disturb human remains. Geophysical surveys include ground penetrating radar (GPR), electrical resistivity tomography (ERT), resistance survey, and magnetometry. These methods measure variations in subsurface physical properties to identify anomalies such as graves, structural remains, pits, and other forms of disturbances.

GPR allows archaeologists to generate three-dimensional images of buried features and estimate their depth beneath the surface. ERT uses an electrical charge in the soil to also creates an image of what is below the surface, but at a higher level of detail than GPR, distinguishing between materials such as stone, bone, ceramic, metal and glass. Similarly, resistance survey detects differences in the electrical resistance of soils, allowing archaeologists to identify and differentiate between buried features and the surrounding soil. Magnetometry identifies variations in the Earth’s magnetic field caused by buried objects or disturbances such as excavation or burning. In the rare case that excavation is undertaken, it is typically limited and carefully controlled, often stopping once the presence of graves is confirmed and leaving most remains where they were found to respect ethical and religious constraints. Geochemical testing can also be used in targeted areas to analyze soil for chemical indicators of human decomposition or to detect residues such as Zyklon B or carbon monoxide in gas chamber remains.

== Major sites of archaeological exploration ==
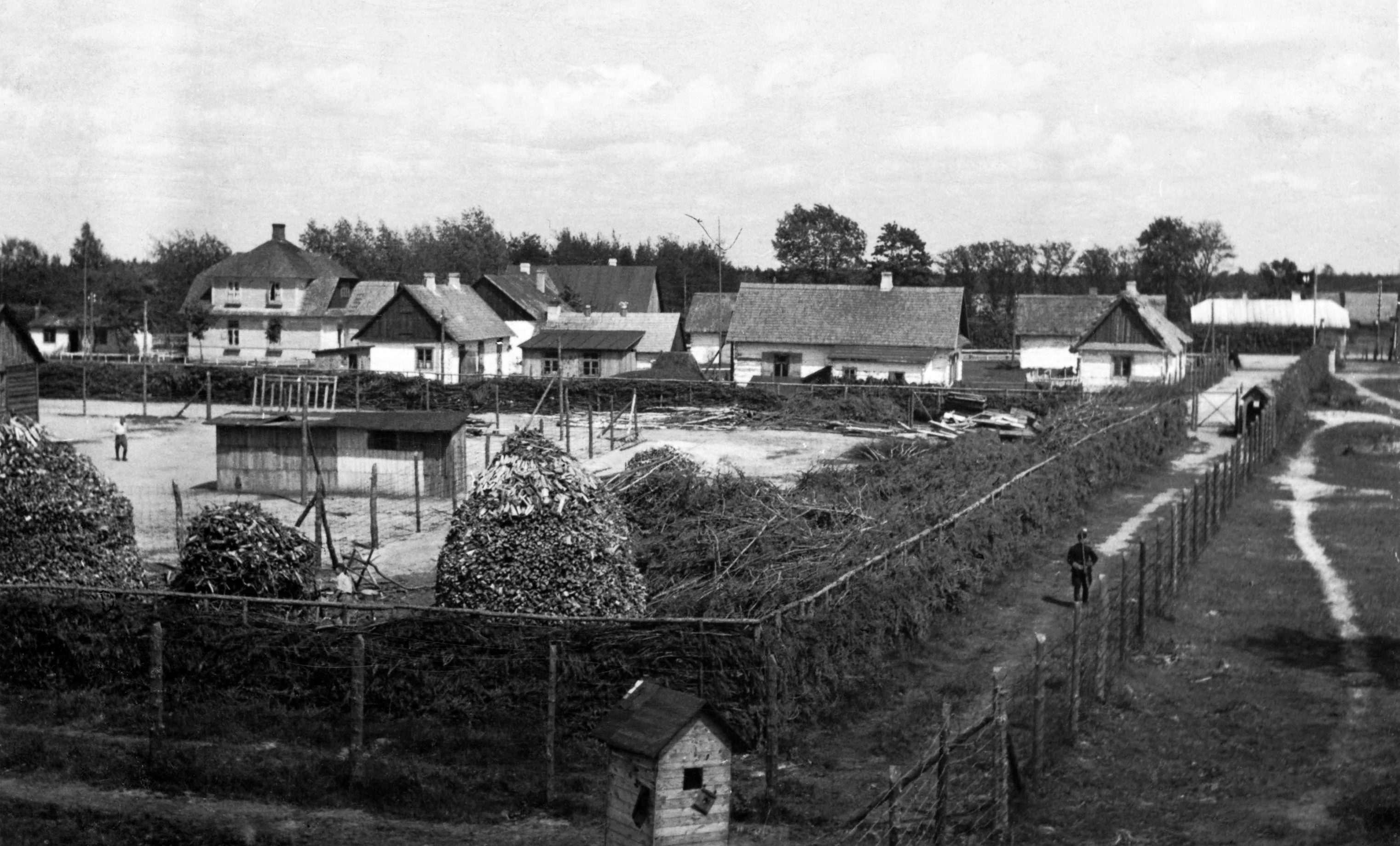
Sobibór extermination camp in the summer of 1943.

=== Sobibór ===
Following a prisoner revolt, the Sobibór extermination camp was destroyed in late 1943. The first attempt to investigate the site was in the year 2000, led by archaeologist Andrzej Kola. Through manual drilling, structural excavation, and core sampling, Kola identified seven mass graves of varying dimensions and uncovered remains of five other structures. Among these was a large structure labeled “Building E”, which was predicted to serve as a processing area for the undressing of victims and the sorting of their belongings.

In 2007, a new research team led by Isaac Gilead, Yoram Haimi, and Wojciech Mazurek sought to continue Kola’s work. However, they found contradicting results when they uncovered that the site labeled as “Building E” by Kola was not in fact a gas chamber nor undressing barrack, instead an area suggested to contain remains of camp security fences. In 2008, this team employed non-invasive geophysical methods, including aerial photography, ground penetrating radar, and GPS mapping. These methods allowed the researchers to delineate the mass graves and distinguish the extermination camp’s original perimeter from the surrounding forest.

From 2012 until 2020, Mazurek and Haimi, joined by Ivar Schute, conducted more extensive excavations. These explorations led to the discovery of the ‘Schlauch’ (the tube), which was the route which victims were forced to walk to their deaths. Following this path ultimately led to the uncovering of the foundations of the gas chambers, confirming the exact locations and dimensions of the area. Additionally, tens of thousands of artifacts were found, including the personal belongings of Jewish deportees who had arrived at the train station’s unloading platform unaware of the camp’s true purpose.

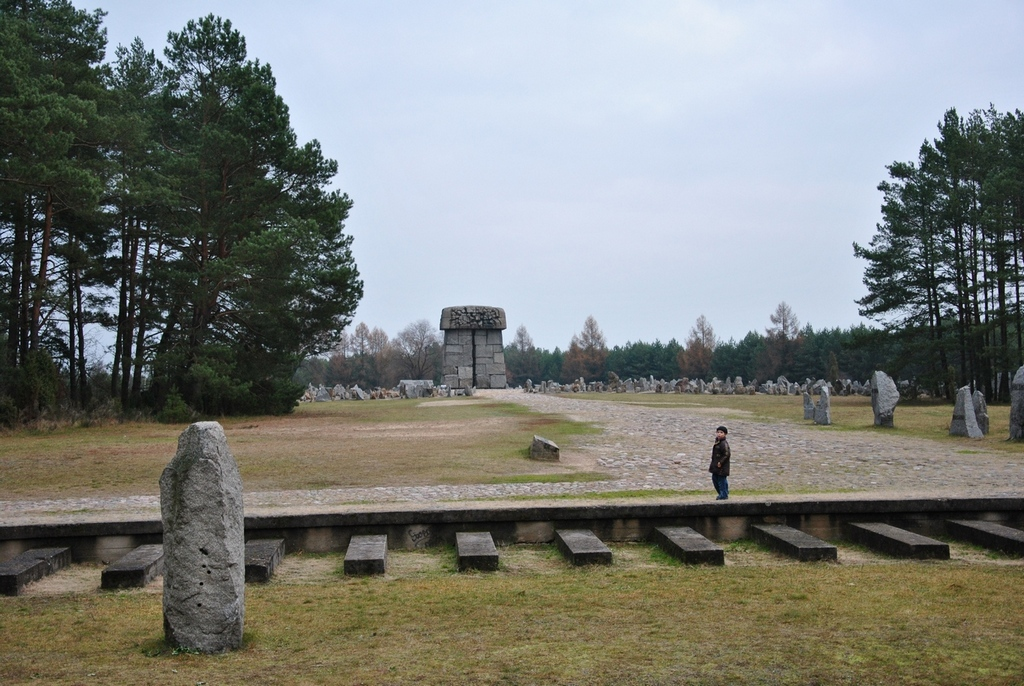
Treblinka extermination camp (Treblinka II) memorial, with stones representing gravestones and concrete blocks marking the path of where the former railroad tracks used to be.

=== Treblinka II ===
In the fall of 1943, the Treblinka extermination camp (known as Treblinka II) was dismantled to remove evidence of the camp’s existence. Although surveys of the area were taken in 1945 and once again in 2000, the first non-invasive archaeological exploration began in 2012 with a team led by Caroline Sturdy Colls. Such non-invasive approaches included walkover surveys to assess the extent of the site and to record key features observed, documentary surveys, witness testimonies, historic aerial imagery, and LiDAR to create topographic maps that revealed the presence of features associated with the former camps, such as earthworks and depressions, which were hidden in the dense woodland. Through these non-invasive methods, researchers were able to identify the locations of various camp structures and mass graves, which then allowed them to conduct targeted, minimally invasive excavations to locate the remains of the old gas chambers and orange terracotta floor tiles stamped with a Star of David. Such tiles were used in many pre-war Jewish ritual baths (mikveh), supporting witness accounts that the Nazis modeled gas chambers after these Jewish ritual baths as a manner of deception.
