= Material fact =

Fact whose suppression would result in a different decision

A material fact is a fact that a reasonable person would recognize as relevant to a decision to be made, as distinguished from an insignificant, trivial, or unimportant detail. In other words, it is a fact, the suppression of which would reasonably result in a different decision.

Falsification of a material fact that would cause a party to a contract to refrain from entering into the contract may be grounds for rescission. For example, misrepresentation of a material fact on an application for insurance may give an insurance company grounds to rescind an insurance policy.

== See also ==
- Materiality (law)
- Material witness
