= Immigration and Nationality Law Review =

- Discipline: Immigration and nationality law
- Language: English

Publication details
- History: Founded in 1976
- Publisher: William S. Hein & Co., Inc. (United States)
- Frequency: Annual

Standard abbreviations
- Bluebook: Immgr. & Nat'lity L. Rev.
- ISO 4: Immigr. Natly. Law Rev.

The Immigration and Nationality Law Review (INLR) is an internationally recognized annual law journal, published by William S. Hein & Co., Inc., of New York City.

== Overview ==
Created in 1976, the INLR was originally a reprint journal that served the scholarly community as an anthology of the most seminal law review articles on immigration and nationality. It included legislative summaries and a limited number of original contributions. Since its move to the University of Cincinnati College of Law in 1999 from Western New England College School of Law, the journal has substantially expanded to include student casenotes, comments, book reviews and essays. Today, the INLR is one of only two major student-edited American law journals devoted exclusively to the study of immigration law, the other being the Georgetown Immigration Law Journal. The Journal publishes articles on timely issues by professors and practitioners, coordinates symposia on important topics, and produces thoughtful student notes and comments. The INLR's broad scholarly scope often transcends the subject of immigration and encompasses the related fields of constitutional and criminal law, human rights, international law, and ethnic conflict. Second and third year law students are responsible for coordinating the production of the journal under the guidance of Professor Bradford Mank, the INLR's faculty advisor.

The journal consists of original immigration and nationality law articles, republications of immigration and nationality law articles, and original student submissions which are selected for their excellence. While primarily focused on immigration law, which seeks to define who may enter and reside in a country, INLR incorporates subject matter well beyond immigration. In particular, the INLR addresses issues of nationality which considers the formal relationship between a citizen of a nation and the nation itself. Since immigration and nationality work together to delineate citizenship and residency, they play an important part in the ongoing dialogue regarding national identity. Moreover, immigration and nationality frequently implicate issues of race, gender, class, and national security.
