= Federal Correctional Institution, Englewood =

Low-security prison in Colorado, US

Coordinates: 39°38′30″N 105°06′19″W

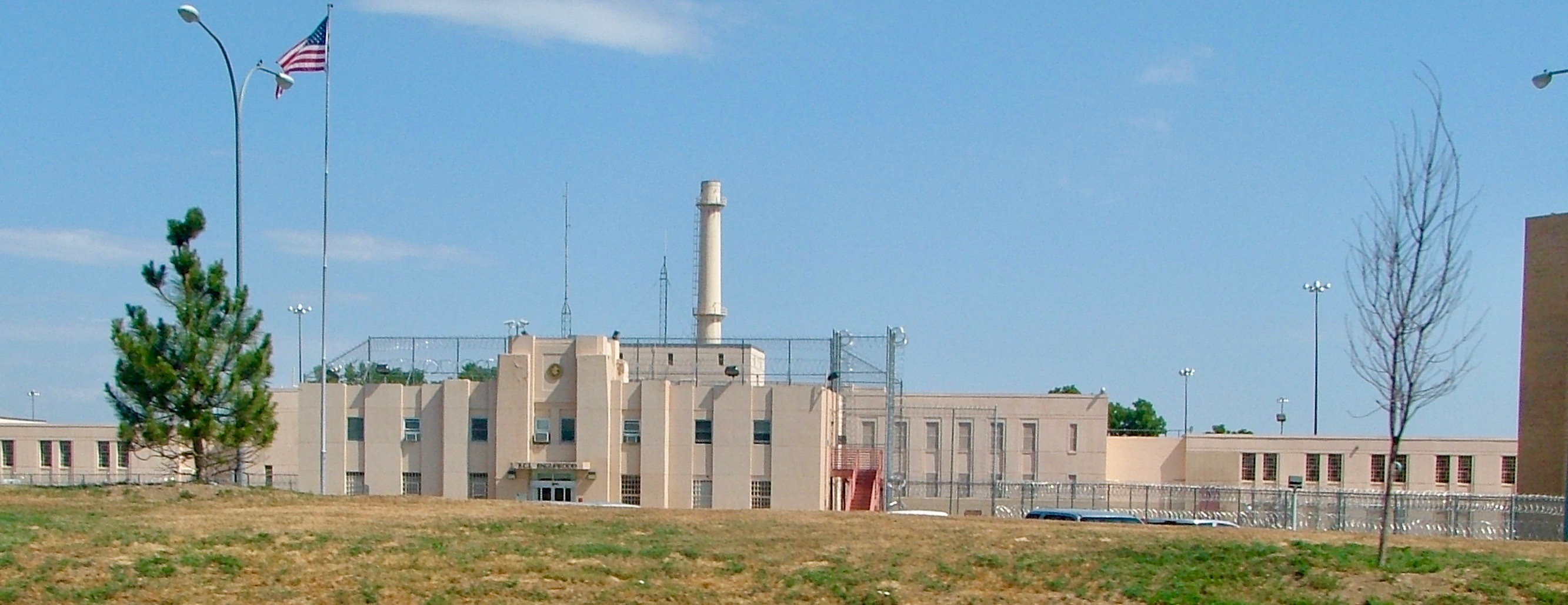
- Interactive map of Federal Correctional Institution, Englewood
- Location: Jefferson County, near Bow Mar, Colorado
- Status: Operational
- Security class: Low-security (with minimum-security prison camp)
- Population: 1,034 (186 in prison camp)
- Opened: 1988
- Managed by: Federal Bureau of Prisons

The Federal Correctional Institution, Englewood (FCI Englewood) is a low-security United States federal prison for male inmates in Colorado. It is operated by the Federal Bureau of Prisons (BOP), a division of the United States Department of Justice. The facility also has an administrative detention center and an adjacent satellite prison camp for minimum-security offenders.

FCI Englewood is located in unincorporated Jefferson County. FCI Englewood is located off of U.S. Route 285 and Kipling Street, 10 miles (16 km) southwest of Downtown Denver. The facility is named after the city of Englewood, and has a Littleton mailing address, but is not in either city.

== Notable incidents ==
On April 2, 2012, FCI Englewood was placed on lockdown after a white powdery substance was found inside an envelope addressed to an inmate during a routine mail screening. A hazardous materials team was called to the prison and local and federal law enforcement authorities were notified. The substance was determined to be harmless. The Bureau of Prisons would not identify the inmate to whom the letter was addressed.

On December 21, 2018, the day before the 2018–19 United States federal government shutdown began, prisoner Alan May (14675–111) checked out a vehicle for an alleged work job, and drove off the property without anyone noticing. The government agency responsible for tracking down escaped prisoners was not notified until December 26. The run ended on August 3, 2023, when Deputy U.S. Marshals arrested Allen Todd May, 58, at a residence in Fort Lauderdale.

== Notable inmates (current and former) ==
=== Current; child pornography ===
Inmate Name	Register Number	Photo	Status	Details
Jared Fogle	12919-028		Serving a 15-year sentence; scheduled for release on March 24, 2029.	Former spokesperson for Subway sandwich restaurants; pleaded guilty in 2015 to traveling across state lines to engage in illicit sexual conduct with minors and receiving child pornography.
Eric Franklin Rosser	07006-028		Serving a 10-year sentence; scheduled for release on February 26, 2027.	Former keyboardist for John Mellencamp; pleaded guilty in 2017 watching child pornography on a bus in Montana.

=== Current; other ===
Inmate Name	Register Number	Photo	Status	Details
Eric Kay	04401-509		Serving a 22-year sentence; scheduled for release on February 18, 2041.	Former communications director for the Los Angeles Angels; convicted in 2022 of drug conspiracy and drug distribution resulting in death for supplying Fentanyl-laced pills that led to the fatal overdose of Angels pitcher Tyler Skaggs in 2019.
Ed Buck	78687-112		Serving a 30-year sentence; scheduled for release on June 3, 2045	Former Democratic Party donor; pleaded guilty in April 2022 to drugging, sexually assaulting, and accidentally killing several African-American male prostitutes as well as maintaining a drug house.
Michael Slager	31292-171		Serving a 20-year sentence; scheduled for release in August 16, 2032.	The police officer who killed Walter Scott.

=== Former ===
Inmate Name	Register Number	Photo	Status	Details
Mike Carona	45335-112		Released to a halfway house on June 11, 2015; served 52 months.	Former Sheriff of Orange County, California, the third-largest sheriff's office in the state; convicted of witness tampering in 2009 for ordering witnesses to lie to investigators conducting a corruption investigation.
Tim DeChristopher	16156-081		Released from custody on April 19, 2013; served a 2-year sentence.	Co-founder of the environmental group Peaceful Uprising; convicted in 2012 of false representation for registering for a 2008 federal land auction and bidding on land worth $1.8 million in order to prevent it from being used for oil and gas exploration.
Robert Gilbeau	56978-298		Released on 17 January 2019.	First active-duty admiral ever to be convicted of a felony. Lied to investigators about relationship with "Fat" Leonard Glenn Francis and pocketed $40,000 in kickbacks
Scott Lee Kimball	14444–006		Was released in December 2002 while awaiting trial for fraud charges in Alaska after he had offered to become an FBI informant. Transferred to USP Coleman and then to USP Florence High; serving a 70-year sentence.	In the year between his release and sentencing, Kimball killed three of the four people he would later plead guilty to, as well as engage in further fraud schemes that netted him thousands of dollars and a 70-year sentence he is currently serving in USP Coleman.
Jeffrey Skilling	29296-179		Transferred to Montgomery FPC. Served a 24-year sentence; released on February 21, 2019.	Committed fraud related to Enron
Jeffrey Alexander Sterling	38338-044		Released on June 14, 2018	Former CIA employee convicted under the Espionage Act for revealing details about Operation Merlin to a journalist
Walter Lee Williams	65562-112		Released on November 7, 2017.	Former FBI Ten Most Wanted fugitive and University of Southern California professor; apprehended in Mexico in 2013; pleaded guilty in 2014 to flying to the Philippines in 2010 to have sex with underage boys he met online.
Rod Blagojevich	40892-424		Commuted by president Trump on February 18, 2020.	Governor of Illinois from 2003 to 2009; convicted in 2011 of wire fraud, extortion and bribery for attempting to sell the U.S. Senate seat vacated by then President Barack Obama in return for money or an appointment to a high-level federal government position.
Rafael Cárdenas Vela	01659-379		Now at FDC Houston (listed as not in BOP custody), scheduled for release on January 20, 2029.	Former high-ranking member of the Gulf Cartel and nephew of incarcerated former cartel boss Osiel Cardenas Guillen; pleaded guilty in 2014 to drug trafficking conspiracy for directing the importation of cocaine from Mexico into the US.
Jake Angeli	24866–509		Held for pre-trial purposes, sentenced to 41 months. Released on May 25, 2023.	Member of QAnon charged for participating in the 2021 Capitol attack
Eric Justin Toth	32508-016		Serving a 25-year sentence. Currently at FCI Fort Dix; scheduled for release in August 8, 2034.	Former Washington, D.C. elementary school teacher and FBI Ten Most Wanted fugitive; apprehended in Nicaragua in 2013 after five years on the run; pleaded guilty in 2013 to production of child pornography.
Jan Rouven Fuechtener	53165-048		Serving a 20-year sentence. Transferred to FCI Thomson; scheduled for release on March 29, 2033.	Former magician and illusionist at Tropicana Las Vegas; convicted on child pornography charges.
Thomas Lane	43954-509		Served a 2-year and 6-month sentence; released on August 20, 2024	One of the police officers who was federally convicted of violating George Floyd’s civil rights and pleaded guilty to involuntary manslaughter in Minnesota state court.

== See also ==
- List of U.S. federal prisons
- Federal Bureau of Prisons
- Incarceration in the United States
