= Jan Rouven =

German magician and artist (born 1977)

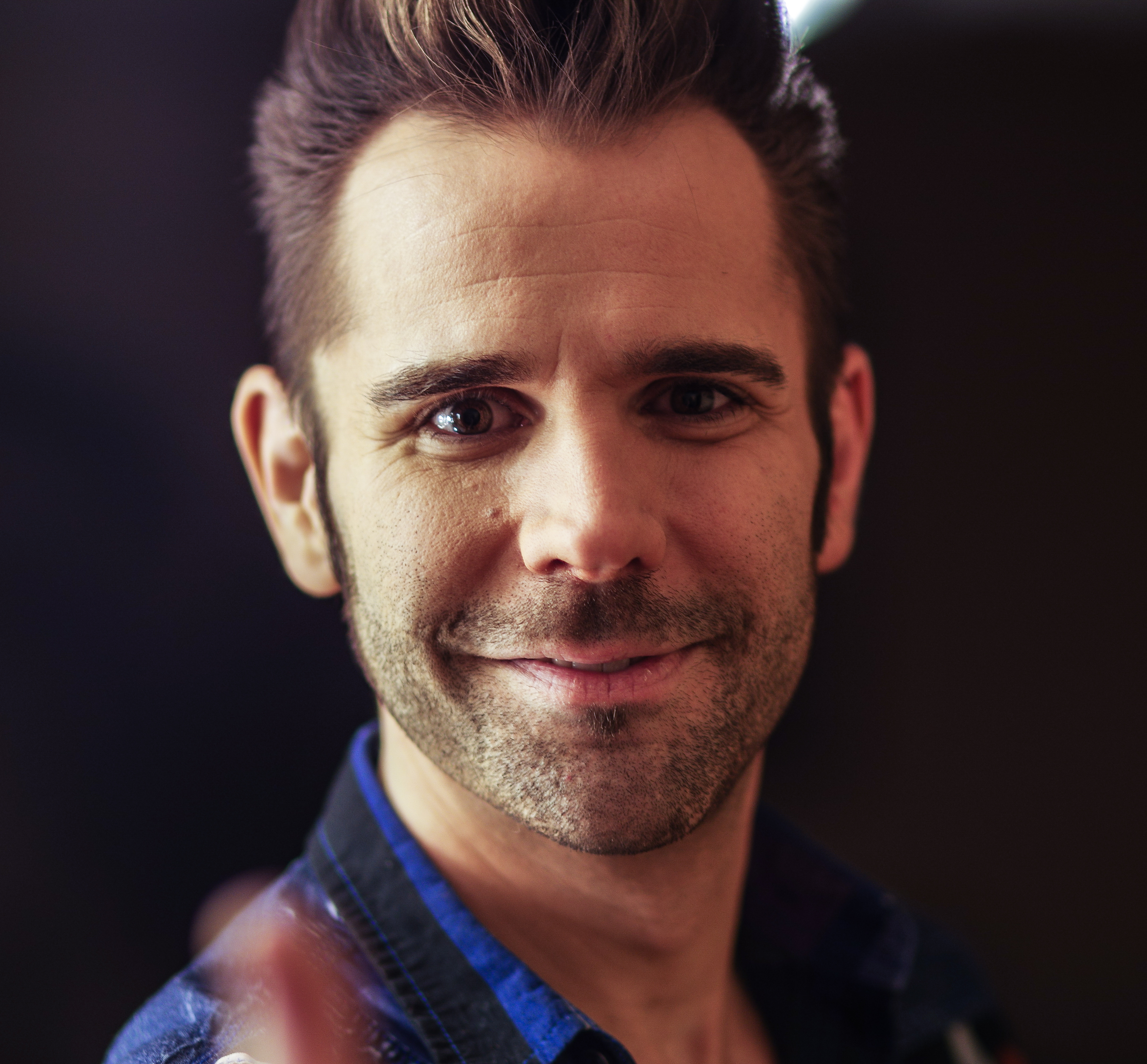
- Tropicana Las Vegas, 2014
- Born: Jan Rouven Fuechtener; 8 July 1977 (age 49); Frechen, West Germany
- Citizenship: Germany
- Occupations: Magician, artist
- Spouse: Frank Alfter (m. 2015)
- Status: Incarcerated at FCI Thomson
- Convictions: 28 February 2019; 7 years ago
- Penalty: 240 months (20 years) in federal prison, $500,000 fine and deportation to Germany

Details
- Date apprehended: 17 March 2016; 10 years ago

Jan Rouven Fuechtener (born 8 July 1977) is a German sex offender, artist and magician. He was primarily known for his show The New Illusions which took place at Tropicana Las Vegas from 2014 to 2016. Fuechtener was initially arrested in March 2016 and charged with owning child pornography by the FBI. He has been incarcerated ever since after being held without bail.

On 28 February 2019 he was sentenced to 240 months (20 years) in federal prison and was ordered to pay a $500,000 fine for possession, receipt and distribution of more than 9,000 images and videos of child pornography. Fuechtener, a citizen of Germany, will be deported after serving his sentence. He was incarcerated at FCI Englewood near Englewood, Colorado, a minimum security prison. In June 2025 he was moved to Federal Correctional Institution, Thomson in Thomson, Illinois.

== Awards ==
- 2006: Le Festival de la Magie with the Mandrake d'Or award from the French Academy of Illusionists
