= Dennis L. Montgomery =

Computer software designer (born 1953)

- Born: July 9, 1953 (age 73); Mena, Arkansas
- Occupation: Software designer

Dennis Lee Montgomery (born July 9, 1953) is an American software designer and former medical technician who sold computer programs to federal officials that he claimed would decode secret Al-Qaeda messages hidden in Al Jazeera broadcasts and identify terrorists based on Predator drone videos. A 2010 Playboy investigation called Montgomery "The man who conned the Pentagon", saying he won millions in federal contracts for his supposed terrorist-exposing intelligence software. The software was later reported to have been an elaborate hoax and Montgomery's former lawyer called him a "con artist" and "habitual liar engaged in fraud".

== Career ==
=== eTreppid Technologies, LLC ===
Montgomery became a partner in 1998 to Warren G. Trepp, the former chief junk bond trader for Michael Milken at Drexel Burnham Lambert, and another investor, Wayne Prim, to develop and sell audio, video, and data compression software under the banner eTreppid Technologies. As Executive Vice President and Chief technology officer of eTreppid, Montgomery led the company's efforts to develop the company's software and promote it to government agencies associated with tracking terrorist activities. In 2004, eTreppid was awarded a $30 million no-bid contract with United States Special Operations Command and was ranked the 16th-largest defense contractor that year, according to Aerospace Daily.

=== Blxware partnership ===
After his separation from eTreppid, Montgomery joined with Edra and Tim Blixseth to bring his alleged terrorist tracking software to other U.S. and foreign government clients. With the Blixseths and former presidential candidate Jack Kemp, he helped form OpSpring LLC, later renamed Blxware. Via Blxware, Montgomery, acting Chief Scientist, pursued selling his terror tracking software to the U.S. and Israel governments, leveraging political connections of the Blixseth partnership. Blxware's owners Edra and Tim Blixseth divorced in 2008 and Blxware became part of Edra Blixseth's sole property. She filed for personal bankruptcy in 2009, which resulted in a Chapter 7 liquidation of her assets, including Blxware and its associated software and intellectual property.

== Terrorist software hoax ==
National Public Radio reported, "For several months starting in the fall of 2003, Montgomery's analysis led directly to national code orange security alerts and cancelled flights. The only problem: he was making it all up."

Montgomery's software claims were reportedly responsible for a false terror alert which grounded international flights and caused Department of Homeland Security Secretary Tom Ridge to raise the government's security level. In February 2006, the Federal Bureau of Investigation (FBI) and U.S. Air Force office of Special Investigations opened an economic espionage and theft of intellectual property investigation into Montgomery and Blxware.

In 2015, Montgomery, through his counsel Larry Klayman, sued James Risen, the author of Pay Any Price: Greed, Power, and Endless War, for defamation, alleging the book falsely described Montgomery as "the maestro behind what many current and former U.S. officials and others familiar with the case now believe was one of the most elaborate and dangerous hoaxes in American history." In 2016, a federal court dismissed Montgomery's lawsuit. In November 2017, the United States Court of Appeals for the District of Columbia Circuit affirmed the dismissal.

== Nevada governor bribery scandal ==
During the run-up to the 2006 gubernatorial election, Dennis Montgomery accused gubernatorial candidate Jim Gibbons of accepting bribes while serving as a member of Congress to help Montgomery's company eTreppid Technologies secure military contracts for his terrorist software. In court papers associated with a lawsuit between Montgomery and former business partner Warren Trepp, Montgomery accused Gibbons of accepting casino chips and $100,000 in cash from Trepp during a Caribbean cruise. Montgomery provided copies of what he said were Trepp's personal e-mails that he accessed while working at eTreppid Technologies. Gibbons' lawyers claimed they had evidence that Montgomery had fabricated the emails and presented computer expert evidence in trial that challenged the authenticity of Montgomery's alleged evidence. In November 2008, Gibbons' defense attorney said that an 18-month investigation by the FBI resulted in no charges and cleared Gibbons of any wrongdoing.

== Confidential informant for Sheriff Joe Arpaio ==
In June 2014, reporter Stephen Lemons of the Phoenix New Times wrote that Montgomery had been hired by Sheriff Joe Arpaio of the Maricopa County Sheriff's Office (MCSO) as a confidential informant. Lemons, citing an anonymous source in the MCSO, said that Montgomery had claimed that, using data he had obtained while working for the Central Intelligence Agency (CIA), he could prove there was a conspiracy against Arpaio between the U.S. Department of Justice and G. Murray Snow, the federal judge presiding over a racial-profiling lawsuit filed against Maricopa County. In April 2015, Arpaio confirmed the confidential informant relationship in testimony before Judge Snow. At Arpaio's request, two National Security Agency computer specialists examined Montgomery's material and concluded, contrary to Montgomery's representations, that it did not contain data from the CIA. Arpaio later characterized the result of Montgomery's investigation as "junk".

In May 2015, Montgomery attempted to intervene in the contempt proceedings against Joe Arpaio that had stemmed from the racial-profiling lawsuit. Montgomery, through his counsel Larry Klayman, asked Judge Snow to recuse himself; Montgomery also asked the United States Court of Appeals for the Ninth Circuit to replace the judge, but the court declined to do so.

Reuters reported, "In 2019, Montgomery sued Arpaio, Zullo and Mackiewicz alleging libel. The computer programmer claimed the sheriff’s office had hired him to “hack into databases and websites to help them prove their beliefs about President Obama’s ancestry and birth information.” The suit was dismissed in 2022."

== Wiretapping allegations ==
In the wake of the Trump Tower wiretapping allegations, Klayman on Montgomery's behalf claimed that Montgomery had evidence that security agencies have been involved in "systematic illegal surveillance on prominent Americans", including Donald Trump and Jerome Corsi. Mike Zullo, a former member of the MSCO's cold-case posse, similarly echoed the claims about Montgomery's data; Zullo, however, had previously doubted the authenticity of the data.

In June 2017, Montgomery and Klayman jointly sued James Comey and other federal government officials, alleging a coverup of evidence that, according to Montgomery, shows the existence of widespread illegal surveillance by the federal government. In March 2018, the federal district court dismissed their lawsuit.

According to Klayman, Montgomery also claimed these security agencies had manipulated voting in Florida during the 2008 United States presidential election.

== 2020 United States presidential election ==
As part of the attempt to overturn the 2020 United States presidential election, The American Report published stories in which Montgomery claimed a supercomputer called the Hammer, running software called Scorecard, was used to steal votes from Trump. Montgomery's claims were repeated by Mike Lindell and Sidney Powell. Chris Krebs, then the director of the Cybersecurity and Infrastructure Security Agency, characterized the claims as "nonsense" and a "hoax".

At Lindell's August 2021 cyber symposium about the 2020 election, his staff confirmed Montgomery was Lindell's source for data about the election.
