= Jeffrey Sterling =

Jeffrey Sterling may refer to:

- Jeffrey Sterling, Baron Sterling of Plaistow (born 1934), British businessman
- Jeffrey Alexander Sterling, American lawyer and former CIA officer convicted under the Espionage Act
