= State of War: The Secret History of the CIA and the Bush Administration =

2006 book by James Risen

State of War
- Author: James Risen
- Language: English
- Subject: Central Intelligence Agency
- Publisher: Free Press
- Publication date: January 3, 2006
- Publication place: United States
- Media type: Hardcover
- Pages: 256
- ISBN: 0-7432-7066-5

State of War: The Secret History of the CIA and the Bush Administration is a documentary review written by Pulitzer Prize-winning American journalist for The New York Times James Risen. The book was released on January 3, 2006.

Risen writes in State of War that, "[s]everal of the Iranian CIA agents were arrested and jailed, while the fate of some of the others is still unknown", after a CIA official in 2004 sent an Iranian agent an encrypted electronic message, mistakenly including data that could potentially identify "virtually every spy the CIA had inside Iran". The Iranian was a double agent and handed over the information to Iranian intelligence. This also has been denied by an intelligence official. Risen also alleges that the Bush Administration is responsible for transformation of Afghanistan into a "narco-state", that provides a purported 80% of the world's heroin supply.

Risen was subpoenaed twice to disclose his sources for the book, first by the George W. Bush administration and then by the Barack Obama administration. Risen declined to do so both times, but in January 2011, it was claimed that former CIA agent Jeffrey Alexander Sterling had illegally leaked classified information to Risen about the agency's involvement in Iran's nuclear program. Sterling was convicted and served two years in prison; he maintains his innocence.

== See also ==
- COINTELPRO - FBI counter-intelligence program investigating and disrupting dissident political organizations within the United States
- ECHELON - secretive world-wide signals intelligence and analysis network run by the UKUSA Community, capturing radio and satellite communications, telephone calls, faxes and e-mails nearly anywhere in the world
- Carnivore - FBI wiretapping of e-mail and internet communications through proxy computers installed at Internet service providers
- CALEA - to make clear a telecommunications carrier's duty to cooperate in the interception of communications for Law Enforcement purposes, and for other purposes
- Operation Mockingbird - alleged Central Intelligence Agency operation to influence domestic and foreign media
