= Pay Any Price: Greed, Power, and Endless War =

- Author: James Risen
- Language: English
- Subject: War on terror, Iraq War, Emergency powers
- Publisher: Houghton Mifflin Harcourt
- Publication date: October 2014
- Publication place: United States
- Media type: Print (Hardback)
- Pages: 285
- ISBN: 978-0-544-34141-8
- Dewey Decimal: 973.931

Pay Any Price: Greed, Power, and Endless War is a 2014 non-fiction book by the American journalist James Risen. The book examines what Risen calls the "homeland security industrial complex", the effects of the war on terror and the resulting financial malfeasance during the American occupation of Iraq. Risen alleges that almost 12 billion dollars sent from the U.S. to Iraq "is either unaccounted for or has simply disappeared". The book also investigates the use of torture and the cooperative role of the American Psychological Association in the enhanced interrogation program, as well as the threat to the right to privacy posed by NSA warrantless surveillance.

== Title ==
The title of the book refers to John F. Kennedy's Inaugural Address on January 20, 1961, when he said, "Let every nation know, whether it wishes us well or ill, that we shall pay any price, bear any burden, meet any hardship, support any friend, oppose any foe, in order to assure the survival and the success of liberty."

== APA investigation ==
In November 2014, the American Psychological Association announced that they would hire a lawyer to investigate the book's claims.

== Lawsuit ==
As detailed in the book, Dennis L. Montgomery is an American software designer and former medical technician who sold federal officials computer programs he claimed would decode secret Al Qaeda messages hidden in Al Jazeera broadcasts and identify terrorists based on predator drone videos. In 2015, Montgomery sued Risen for defamation, alleging the book falsely described Montgomery as "the maestro behind what many current and former U.S. officials and others familiar with the case now believe was one of the most elaborate and dangerous hoaxes in American history." In 2016, a federal court dismissed Montgomery's lawsuit. In November 2017, the United States Court of Appeals for the District of Columbia Circuit affirmed the dismissal.

== Translation ==
The book is translated into Persian and published in Iran. Both translation and publication is done by Fars News Agency publication.

== See also ==
- Manufactured Crisis: The Untold Story of the Iran Nuclear Scare
