= Eric Lichtblau =

American journalist (born 1965)

- Born: 1965 (age 60–61); Syracuse, New York, U.S.
- Occupations: Journalist, author
- Works: Bush's Law; The Nazis Next Door

Eric Lichtblau (born 1965) is an American journalist, reporting for The New York Times in the Washington bureau, as well as the Los Angeles Times, Time magazine, The New Yorker, and the CNN network's investigative news unit. He has earned two Pulitzer Prizes for his work. He received a Pulitzer Prize in 2006 with the New York Times for his reporting on warrantless wiretapping by the National Security Agency. He also was part of the New York Times team that won the Pulitzer in 2017 for coverage of Russia and the Trump campaign. He is the author of Bush's Law: The Remaking of American Justice, and The Nazis Next Door: How America Became a Safe Haven for Hitler's Men.

== Life and career ==
Lichtblau was born to a Jewish family in Syracuse, New York, and graduated from Cornell University in 1987 with majors in government and English. After college, Lichtblau served stints with the Los Angeles Times investigative team in Los Angeles and covered various law enforcement beats. He worked at the Los Angeles Times for 15 years, covering the Justice Department in their Washington bureau between 1999 and 2000.

Lichtblau joined The New York Times in September 2002 as a correspondent covering the Justice Department, and published his last story for the paper in April 2017. In that month he became an editor for CNN; just two months later, in June 2017, he was among three CNN editors who resigned following the retraction of a report regarding alleged contact between the presidential transition team of Donald Trump and a Russian state-owned bank.

Lichtblau and his wife Leslie Frances Zirkin (b. c. 1973) live in the Washington, D.C. area with their four children, including Matthew and Andrew Lichtblau.

== Books ==
Lichtblau is the author of Bush's Law: The Remaking of American Justice. Lichtblau and fellow New York Times reporter James Risen were awarded a 2006 Pulitzer Prize.

In The Nazis Next Door: How America Became a Safe Haven for Hitler's Men, Lichtblau disclosed details of Operation Paperclip, a story the Central Intelligence Agency hid from the American public for over 60 years. Fully aware of the monstrous crimes many had committed, the U.S. government nevertheless provided sanctuary and employment for thousands of Nazi spies and scientists after World War II. Lichtblau estimates, based on research by Holocaust scholar Richard Breitman, that "the C.I.A., the F.B.I. and other agencies used at least 1,000 ex-Nazis and collaborators as spies and informants after the war". The CIA's recruits became anti-Soviet "assets" whose intelligence value "outweighed what one official called 'moral lapses' in their service to the Third Reich."

Most of the recruited Nazi scientists had worked on Hitler's V-2 rocket project. The most well known of these men was Wernher von Braun, often described as the "father of rocket science". The V-2 rockets killed thousands of British and Belgian citizens during WWII, and the rocket production process ruthlessly exploited concentration camp labor. CIA directors insisted that America's dominance in space technology was far more important than prosecuting war criminals. Elizabeth Holtzman described The Nazis Next Door as a "fast paced, important book about the Justice Department's efforts to bring Nazi war criminals in the US to justice that also uses recently declassified facts to expose the secret, reprehensible collaboration of US intelligence agencies with those very Nazis." In both of his books, Lichtblau performed in-depth research to uncover what many would consider abuses of power by government agencies.

Lichtblau said in an interview that "Of all the survivors in the camps, only a few thousand came in the first year or so. A visa was a precious commodity, and there were immigration policymakers in Washington who were on record saying that they didn't think the Jews should be let in because they were 'lazy people' or 'entitled people' and they didn't want them in. But there were many, many thousands of Nazi collaborators who got visas to the U.S. while the survivors did not, even though they had been, for instance, the head of a Nazi concentration camp, the warden at a camp, or the secret police chief in Lithuania who signed the death warrants for people."

== Controversy ==
On October 31, 2016, The New York Times published an article by Lichtblau and Steven Lee Myers indicating that intelligence agencies believed that Russian interference in the 2016 United States presidential election was not aimed at electing Republican presidential candidate Donald Trump. However, it was subsequently revealed that multiple United States intelligence agencies were conducting an investigation at the time into possible covert aid from the Kremlin to the Trump campaign. This led to criticism of Times' coverage of the election, and speculation that the Times reporting — and the October 31 article in particular — contributed to Trump's victory. On January 20, 2017, the Times published an article by the public editor acknowledging that the Times staff, including the editors and Lichtblau, had access to materials and details indicating that the Russian interference was aimed at electing Trump, contradicting the October 31 article, and stating that "a strong case can be made that the Times was too timid in its decisions not to publish the material it had". Daniel Pfeiffer, former senior advisor to president Barack Obama, characterized the decision not to publish the story while at the same time publishing many articles that fueled the Hillary Clinton email controversy as a "black mark" in the newspaper's history. The New York Times editor Dean Baquet dismissed the controversy, stating that the public editor article is a "bad column" that comes to a "fairly ridiculous conclusion". It was later that in the editing of the piece, New York Times editors "downplayed what Lichtblau and Myers wanted to highlight" in the article and "cast the absence of a conclusion as the article's central theme rather than the fact of the investigation itself", which was "contrary to the wishes of the reporters."

In June 2017, Lichtblau resigned from CNN after an article about a Senate investigation into Russian Direct Investment Fund was retracted because it did not meet CNN’s editorial standards.

== Works ==
- 2008: Bush's Law: The Remaking of American Justice (Pantheon, ISBN 0-375-42492-X)
- 2014: The Nazis Next Door: How America Became a Safe Haven for Hitler's Men (Houghton Mifflin Harcourt, ISBN 978-0547669199)
