= Thomson, Illinois =

Thomson
- Village
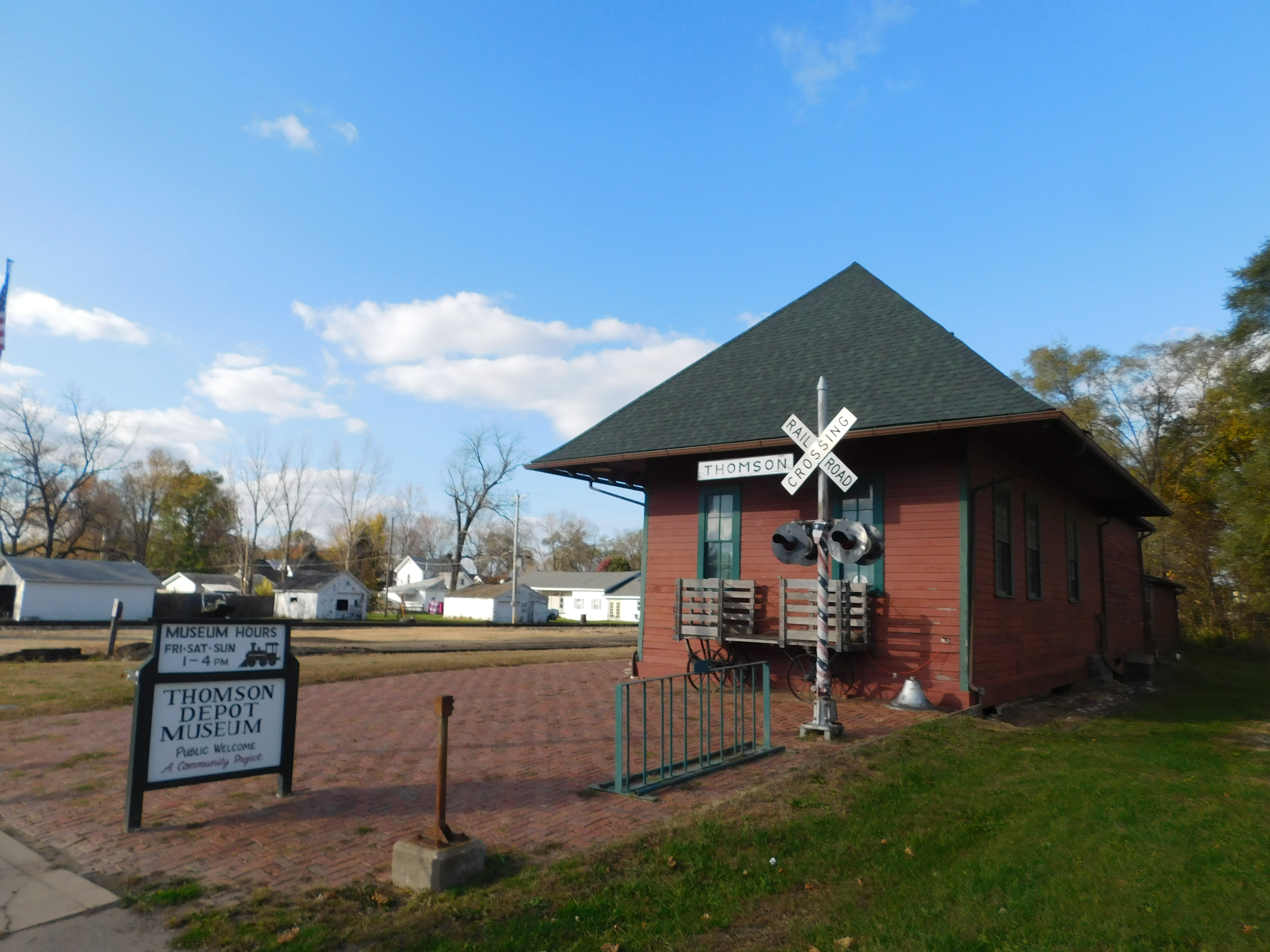
- The Chicago, Burlington and Quincy Railroad depot in Thomson in November 2016, serving as a museum.
- Nickname: The Melon Capital of the World
- Location of Thomson in Carroll County, Illinois.
- Coordinates: 41°58′46″N 90°07′15″W
- Country: United States
- State: Illinois
- County: Carroll
- Township: York

Government
  - Village President: Vicky Trager

Area
  - Total: 2.22 sq mi (5.75 km^{2})
  - Land: 2.22 sq mi (5.75 km^{2})
  - Water: 0 sq mi (0.00 km^{2})
- Elevation: 604 ft (184 m)

Population (2020)
  - Total: 1,610
  - Density: 725.7/sq mi (280.19/km^{2})
- Time zone: UTC-6 (CST)
  - Summer (DST): UTC-5 (CDT)
- ZIP code: 61285
- Area code: 815
- FIPS code: 17-75172
- GNIS feature ID: 2399974
- Website: http://www.thomsonil.com

Thomson is a village along Illinois Route 84 near the Mississippi River in Carroll County, Illinois, United States. As of the 2020 census, Thomson had a population of 1,610. Just north of the village is the United States Penitentiary, Thomson, a mostly-unused former state prison, purchased by the Federal Bureau of Prisons in 2012. Currently, USP Thomson houses over 100 low-security inmates as it remodels to federal maximum-security standards.

Thomson is known for its watermelons, and it has the nickname "Melon Capital of the World."

== History ==
=== Prison ===
The United States Penitentiary, Thomson (formerly Thomson Correctional Center) was opened in 2001, but as of 2009 has never had a prisoner in its main, 1600-bed maximum-security unit; the only prison population has been in the 200-bed minimum-security unit, which was populated in 2006 and averages about 150 prisoners. The minimum security unit has an annual budget of $7 million. State budget constraints, as well as labor union opposition to closing other state prisons, prevented the maximum-security prison from opening.

In 2008, Illinois Governor Rod Blagojevich proposed closing the state prison in Pontiac, Illinois and opening the Thomson maximum-security unit instead. However, Blagojevich was subsequently arrested on December 9, 2008, and removed from office. His replacement, Governor Pat Quinn, canceled plans to close the Pontiac prison in March 2009, leaving Thomson unused.

In 2009, the United States government announced that prisoners at the Guantanamo Bay detention camp would be moved to the prison in Thomson. CNN stated that before the decision was announced, many people in the town wanted the Guantanamo prisoners to be housed there so the town could get economic benefits.

On December 15, 2009, President Barack Obama ordered the federal government to proceed with acquisition of the underutilized state prison in Thomson to be the new home for a limited number of terror suspects held at Guantanamo Bay, Cuba. The facility was also used as a Bureau of Prisons facility to house other federal inmates. In response to the 2009 presidential order, the American Federation of State County and Municipal Employees (AFSCME), which represents 13,000 Illinois prison staff, argued that rather than turn the maximum-security unit over to the Federal government, it should be used to relieve overcrowding in other Illinois prisons. AFSCME claims that the other facilities were designed for 32,000 prisoners, but currently house 45,000. Subsequent Congressional banning of federal expenditures for imprisoning in the United States of terror suspects held at Guantanamo Bay, Cuba, stopped the Obama plans regarding those terror suspects, even though the federal government announced on October 2, 2012, that the acquisition of Thomson is going forward.

=== Fire Protection ===
Sometime in the 1800s, Thomson formed a volunteer fire department with a hose cart to protect the village from fire. During the 1940s, the Thomson Fire Protection District was formed to fight fires in both the village itself and the surrounding countryside. In the early 1970s, the fire protection district began providing Basic Life Support ambulance services to the area. As of 2026, the Thomson Fire Protection District provides Fire, Rescue, and Basic Life Support Ambulance service to the village and surrounding area with a staff of approximately 22 paid per call/volunteer firefighters. The department members respond from wherever they might be upon receiving an alert. All firefighters are required to be cross-trained as either Emergency Medical Responders or Emergency Medical Technicians. The department has a fleet of state-of-the-art vehicles, including both a 2021 Pierce Enforcer Rescue Engine and a 2007 engine of the same model. The department also owns a 2017 Ford/Horton Ambulance, 2 Peterbilt Tanker trucks (one holding 4000 gallons and the other holding 2000), two 4WD brush trucks (one 1997 Dodge Ram 3500 and one 2005 GMC Topkick), a 2018 Ford F-250 command vehicle, a Polarias Ranger with offroad firefighting and EMS rescue capabilities, a trailer with rescue gear including a grain bin rescue tube, a large amount of life safety rope and ice rescue equipment and a boat utilized for water rescues on the nearby Mississippi river. All of this is provided by tax dollars and fundraisers held by the members. The fire district is a part of MABAS Division 29 and responds to box alarms throughout Carroll County as well as anywhere else that they may be needed.

== Geography ==
Thomson is located approximately one mile (kilometer and a half) east of the Mississippi River in northwestern Illinois, 9 miles (14 km) northeast of Clinton, Iowa, 38 miles (61 km) northeast of Moline, Illinois in the Quad Cities, and 120 miles (190 km) west of Chicago.

According to the 2021 census gazetteer files, Thomson has a total area of 2.22 square miles (5.75 km^{2}), all land.

== Demographics ==
Historical population
Census	Pop.	Note	%±
1880	380		—
1890	374		−1.6%
1900	467		24.9%
1910	487		4.3%
1920	495		1.6%
1930	508		2.6%
1940	529		4.1%
1950	559		5.7%
1960	543		−2.9%
1970	617		13.6%
1980	911		47.6%
1990	538		−40.9%
2000	559		3.9%
2010	590		5.5%
2020	1,610		172.9%
U.S. Decennial Census

=== 2020 census ===
As of the 2020 census, Thomson had a population of 1,610. The population density was 725.55 inhabitants per square mile (280.14/km^{2}). The median age was 37.5 years. 7.2% of residents were under the age of 18, and 7.6% of residents were 65 years of age or older. For every 100 females, there were 491.9 males, and for every 100 females age 18 and over, there were 611.4 males age 18 and over.

0.0% of residents lived in urban areas, while 100.0% lived in rural areas.

There were 233 households in Thomson, of which 25.3% had children under the age of 18 living in them. Of all households, 44.6% were married-couple households, 18.5% were households with a male householder and no spouse or partner present, and 28.3% were households with a female householder and no spouse or partner present. About 34.3% of all households were made up of individuals, and 18.0% had someone living alone who was 65 years of age or older.

There were 263 housing units, of which 11.4% were vacant. The homeowner vacancy rate was 3.4%, and the rental vacancy rate was 8.8%.

Racial composition as of the 2020 census
Race	Number	Percent
White	941	58.4%
Black or African American	590	36.6%
American Indian and Alaska Native	34	2.1%
Asian	7	0.4%
Native Hawaiian and Other Pacific Islander	0	0.0%
Some other race	2	0.1%
Two or more races	36	2.2%
Hispanic or Latino (of any race)	202	12.5%

=== Income and poverty ===
The median income for a household in the village was $51,071, and the median income for a family was $62,031. Males had a median income of $27,330 versus $25,250 for females. The per capita income for the village was $30,156. About 4.7% of families and 11.1% of the population were below the poverty line, including 31.1% of those under age 18 and 3.8% of those age 65 or over.

== Culture ==
The processing plant for Schafer Fisheries is located in Thomson. Annually, in December, Schafer may process up to 300,000 pounds of fish to support the Polish "Christmas Carp" tradition, and sends these packages both domestically and internationally. The retail store is located in Fulton, IL.
