= James Risen =

American journalist (born 1955)

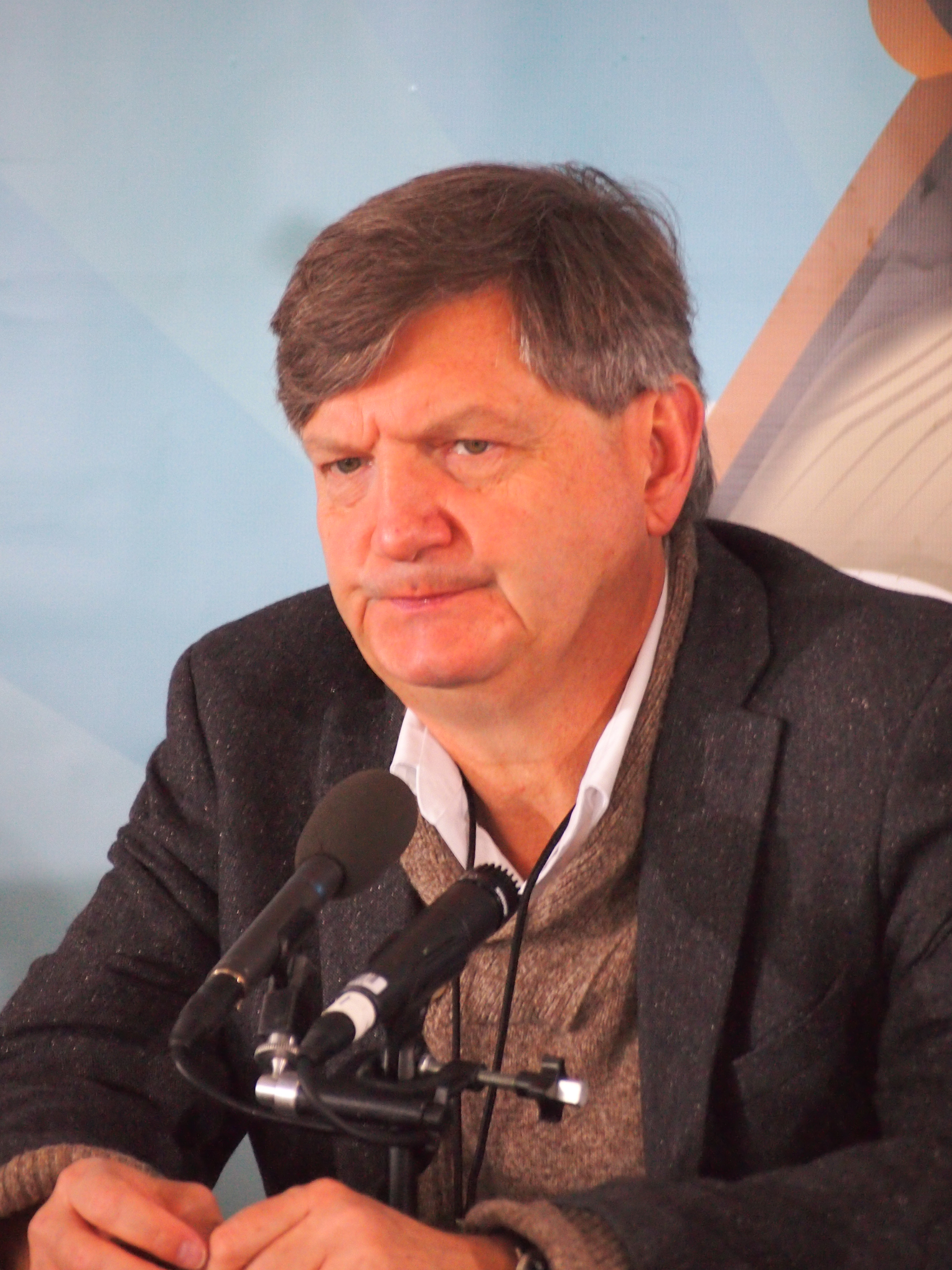
- Risen in 2016
- Born: 1955 (age 70–71); Cincinnati, U.S.
- Education: Brown University (BA); Northwestern University (MS)
- Occupations: Journalist, author

James Risen (born April 27, 1955) is an American journalist and author. He previously worked for The Intercept, The New York Times, and the Los Angeles Times. He has written or co-written many articles concerning U.S. government activities and is the author or co-author of five books, including several about the Central Intelligence Agency (CIA) and intelligence and national security matters, as well as a book about the American public debate about abortion. Risen is a Pulitzer Prize winner.

== Background ==
Risen was born in Cincinnati, Ohio, and grew up in Bethesda, Maryland. He graduated from Brown University in 1977 and received a master's degree in journalism at Northwestern University's Medill School of Journalism in 1978. He has been an investigative reporter for The Intercept. In the spring of 2023, he joined the Philip Merrill College of Journalism at the University of Maryland as the visiting professor on press freedom.

Risen won the 2006 Pulitzer Prize for National Reporting for his stories about President George W. Bush's warrantless wiretapping program. He was a member of The New York Times reporting team that won the 2002 Pulitzer Prize for Explanatory Reporting for its coverage of the September 11 attacks and terrorism. He was also a member of The New York Times reporting team that was a finalist for the 1999 Pulitzer Prize for International Reporting, for coverage of the 1998 United States embassy bombings in East Africa.

Risen has written five books: Wrath of Angels: The American Abortion War (Basic Books) (Judy Thomas, co-author) (1998); The Main Enemy: The Inside Story of the CIA's Final Showdown with the KGB (Random House) (Milt Bearden, co-author) (2003); State of War: The Secret History of the CIA and the Bush Administration (The Free Press) (2006); Pay Any Price: Greed, Power, and Endless War (Houghton Mifflin Harcourt) (2014); The Last Honest Man: The CIA, the FBI, the Mafia, and the Kennedys ― and One Senator's Fight to Save Democracy (Little, Brown) (Thomas Risen, co-author) (2023) State of War was a New York Times bestseller. "Pay Any Price" and "The Last Honest Man" were also New York Times bestsellers. "The Main Enemy" was awarded the 2003 Cornelius Ryan Award for "best nonfiction book on international affairs" by the Overseas Press Club of America.

== Reports on government surveillance programs ==
In 2004, Risen came upon information about the National Security Agency's surveillance of international communications originating or terminating in the United States, code-named "Stellar Wind". He and Eric Lichtblau, who had obtained similar information, co-wrote a story about "Stellar Wind" just before the 2004 presidential election. Risen said the New York Times spiked the story at the request of the White House. The two reporters rewrote and resubmitted the story a number of times after the election but were rejected each time. Risen decided to publish the information in a book along with information about the CIA's Operation Merlin. He warned the paper about the book and suggested it publish the information itself. Bill Keller, executive editor of the New York Times, and Philip Taubman, Washington bureau chief, were furious with Risen. Keller and Taubman negotiated with the Bush administration and, after a delay, the paper published much of Risen and Lichtblau's report about "Stellar Wind" in December 2005. Risen's book, titled State of War: The Secret History of the CIA and the Bush Administration, was published in January 2006.

Risen and Eric Lichtblau were awarded the 2006 Pulitzer Prize for National Reporting for the series of controversial investigative reports that they co-wrote about "Stellar Wind" and about a government program called Terrorist Finance Tracking Program designed to detect terrorist financiers, which involved searches of money transfer records in the international SWIFT database.

== State of War ==
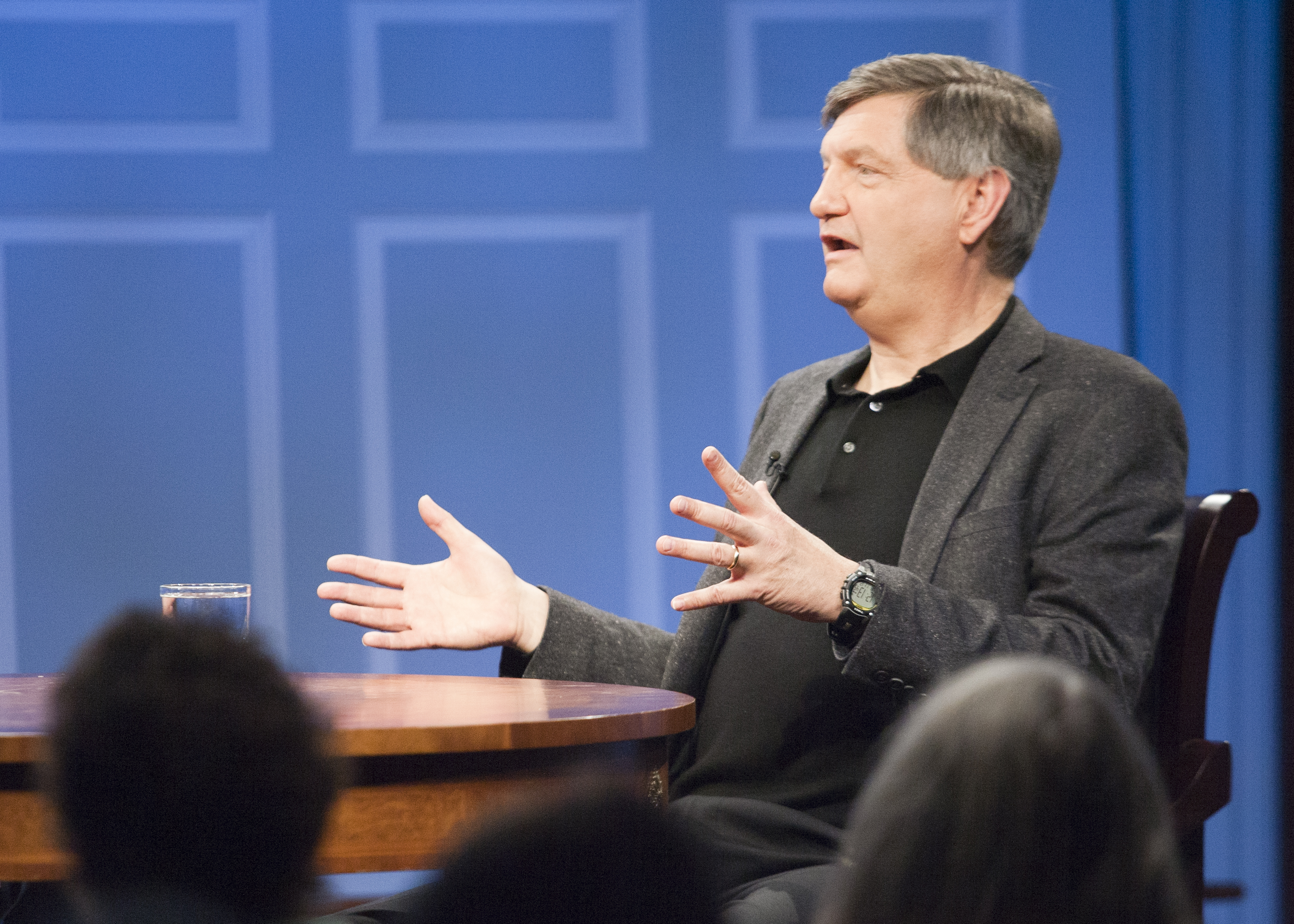
Pay Any Price: Greed, Power, and Endless War at the Miller Center in Charlottesville, Virginia.

Risen is the author of the book State of War: The Secret History of the CIA and the Bush Administration (January 2006). The book conducted important investigations into Central Intelligence Agency activities. It states that the CIA carried out an operation in 2000 (Operation Merlin) intended to delay Iran's alleged nuclear weapons program by feeding it flawed blueprints for key missing components—which backfired and may actually have aided Iran, as the flaw was likely detected and corrected by a former Soviet nuclear scientist the operation used to make the delivery. In early 2003, The New York Times refrained from publication of the story after an intervention by National Security Advisor Condoleezza Rice with the NYT Executive Editor Howell Raines.

While doing research for the book, Risen's email and phone connections with former CIA Operations Officer Jeffrey Alexander Sterling were monitored by the federal government. The US federal government also obtained Risen's credit and bank records. The CIA Public Affairs Office issued a press release alleging that Risen's book contains serious errors in every chapter. However, CIA documents released in January 2015 confirm many details on Operation Merlin.

Risen writes in State of War that "several of the Iranian [CIA] agents were arrested and jailed, while the fate of some of the others is still unknown", after a CIA official in 2004 sent an Iranian agent an encrypted electronic message, mistakenly including data that could potentially identify "virtually every spy the CIA had inside Iran". The Iranian was a double agent and handed over the information to Iranian intelligence. This also has been denied by an intelligence official. Risen also alleges that the Bush administration is responsible for the transformation of Afghanistan into a "narco-state", that provides a purported 80% of the world's heroin supply.

The publication of this book was expedited following the December 16, 2005 NSA leak story. The timing of The New York Times story after the Iraq election in mid December 2005 is a source of controversy since the story was delayed for over a year. The New York Times story appeared two days before a former NSA employee, dismissed in May 2005, requested permission to testify to two congressional intelligence oversight committees. Byron Calame, the Public Editor of The New York Times, wrote in early January 2006 that two senior Times officials refused to comment on the timing of the article. The Department of Justice (DOJ) also conducted an investigation of the sources of the security leak involving the NSA. Risen says this book is based on information from a variety of anonymous sources that he would protect.

The issue of journalists protecting their anonymous sources was widely discussed during this time period due to the Valerie Plame affair. In that case, former New York Times reporter Judith Miller was jailed for refusing to reveal a source for a story of hers. The Attorney General hinted in a Washington Post article on May 22, 2006, that journalists may be charged for any disclosure of classified national security information. In a June 25, 2006 news conference, President George W. Bush was critical of the publication of information of classified programs by The New York Times.

=== United States v. Sterling ===
Jeffrey Alexander Sterling was investigated during the Bush administration. In 2010 he was indicted under the Espionage Act of 1917, one of the few people in US history whose alleged contact with a journalist was punished under espionage law.

In 2007 Risen received a letter from the Justice Department asking him for the sources he used for the CIA-Iran chapter of his book State of War. He was then subpoenaed to appear before a grand jury in January 2008. He fought the subpoena, and it expired in the summer of 2009. In what The New York Times called "a rare step," the Obama administration renewed the subpoena in 2010. In 2011, Risen wrote a detailed response to the subpoena, describing his reasons for refusing to reveal his sources, the public impact of his work, and his experiences with the Bush administration.

In July, 2013, the United States Court of Appeals for the Fourth Circuit ruled that Risen must testify in the trial of Jeffrey Sterling. The court wrote, “so long as the subpoena is issued in good faith and is based on a legitimate need of law enforcement, the government need not make any special showing to obtain evidence of criminal conduct from a reporter in a criminal proceeding." Judge Roger Gregory dissented, writing "The majority exalts the interests of the government while unduly trampling those of the press, and in doing so, severely impinges on the press and the free flow of information in our society."

The Supreme Court rejected his appeal in June 2014, leaving Risen having to testify or go to jail. He stated that he would continue to refuse to testify and was willing to go to jail.

In October 2014, Attorney General Eric Holder, speaking at a Washington, D.C. event, stated “no reporter’s going to jail as long as I’m attorney general.”

In early 2015, Risen attended a pre-trial hearing, where he confirmed that he would not testify. Risen was then excused from testifying, ending a seven-year legal fight over whether he would identify his confidential sources.

== Wen Ho Lee and civil lawsuit ==
In an article that Risen co-wrote with Jeff Gerth for The New York Times that appeared on March 6, 1999, they allege that "a Los Alamos computer scientist who is Chinese-American" had stolen nuclear secrets for China.

The suspect, later identified as Wen Ho Lee, pleaded guilty to a single charge of improper handling of national defense information, the 58 other counts against him were dropped, and he was released from jail on September 13, 2000. No espionage charges were ever proven. The judge apologized to Lee for believing the government and putting him in pretrial solitary confinement for months.

On September 26, 2000, The New York Times apologized for significant errors in reporting of the case. Lee and Helen Zia would later write a book, My Country Versus Me, in which he described Risen and Gerth's work as a "hatchet job on me, and a sloppy one at that", and he points out numerous factual errors in Risen and Gerth's reporting. The New York Times was one of five newspapers, including the Los Angeles Times, which jointly agreed to pay damages to settle a lawsuit concerning their coverage of the case and invasion of privacy.

== Bibliography ==
Books

- Bearden, Milton, and James Risen. The Main Enemy: The Inside Story of the CIA's Final Showdown with the KGB. New York: Random House, 2004. ISBN 0-345-47250-0 (10). ISBN 978-0-345-47250-2 (13). (Also available as an E-book.)
- Risen, James. State of War: The Secret History of the CIA and the Bush Administration. New York: Simon & Schuster (Free Press imprint), 2006. ISBN 0-7432-7066-5 (10). ISBN 978-0-7432-7066-3 (13).
- Risen, James, and Judy Thomas. Wrath of Angels: The American Abortion War. Perseus Publishing, 1999. ISBN 978-0-465-09273-4 (13).
- Risen, James. Pay Any Price: Greed, Power, and Endless War. Houghton Mifflin Harcourt, 2014. ISBN 978-0-5443-4141-8.
- Risen, James (2024). The Last Honest Man: The CIA, the FBI, the Mafia, and the Kennedys ― and One Senator's Fight to Save Democracy. New York: Little, Brown and Company. ISBN 978-0316565134.
