= Operation Merlin =

Covert operation

Operation Merlin was a United States covert operation under the Clinton Administration to provide Iran with a flawed design for a component of a nuclear weapon ostensibly in order to delay the alleged Iranian nuclear weapons program, or to frame Iran.

== History ==
In his book State of War, author and intelligence correspondent for The New York Times James Risen relates that the CIA chose a defected Russian nuclear scientist to provide deliberately flawed nuclear warhead blueprints to Iranian officials in February 2000. According to CIA documents, the search for a suitable Russian emigre with an engineering background in nuclear physics and production began in September 1996. The Russian emigre selected was first contacted by the CIA in August 1994, and received a monthly salary of US$5,000 (plus travel expenses) in 1997 and 1998, which was raised to US$6,000 beginning in February 1999. The weapon component selected was based on the Russian TBA-480 Fire Set (High Voltage Automatic Block), which was modified in an attempt to make it "fatally flawed". The CIA estimated that the TBA-480 Fire Set, which had been developed at Arzamas-16, was 20 years more advanced than anything required to get a first generation nuclear weapon operational. After the delivery of the designs to Iran on March 3, 2000, the CIA extended the employment of the Russian emigre to at least March 2003, with the intention of conveying the flawed TBA-480 plans to another country suspected of interest in developing nuclear weapons.

Risen wrote in his book that President Clinton had approved the operation and that the Bush administration later endorsed the plan. Earlier publication of details on Operation Merlin by the New York Times in 2003 was prevented by the intervention of National Security Advisor Condoleezza Rice with the NYT's Executive Editor Howell Raines.

=== Backfire ===
Operation Merlin backfired when the CIA's Russian contact/messenger noticed flaws in the schematics and told the Iranian nuclear scientists. Instead of crippling Iran's nuclear program, the book alleges, Operation Merlin may have accelerated it by providing useful information: once the flaws were identified, the plans could be compared with other sources, such as those presumed to have been provided to the Iranians by A. Q. Khan.

== Indictment, conviction of former CIA officer ==
In late 2010, former CIA officer Jeffrey Alexander Sterling was indicted for allegedly being the source of some of the information in Risen's book, and was convicted of espionage in January 2015. He was convicted and sentenced to 3 1/2 years in prison.

== See also ==
- Operation Olympic Games
- Stuxnet
- Wen Ho Lee
