= Jeffrey Alexander Sterling =

American CIA officer and convict

Jeffrey A. Sterling
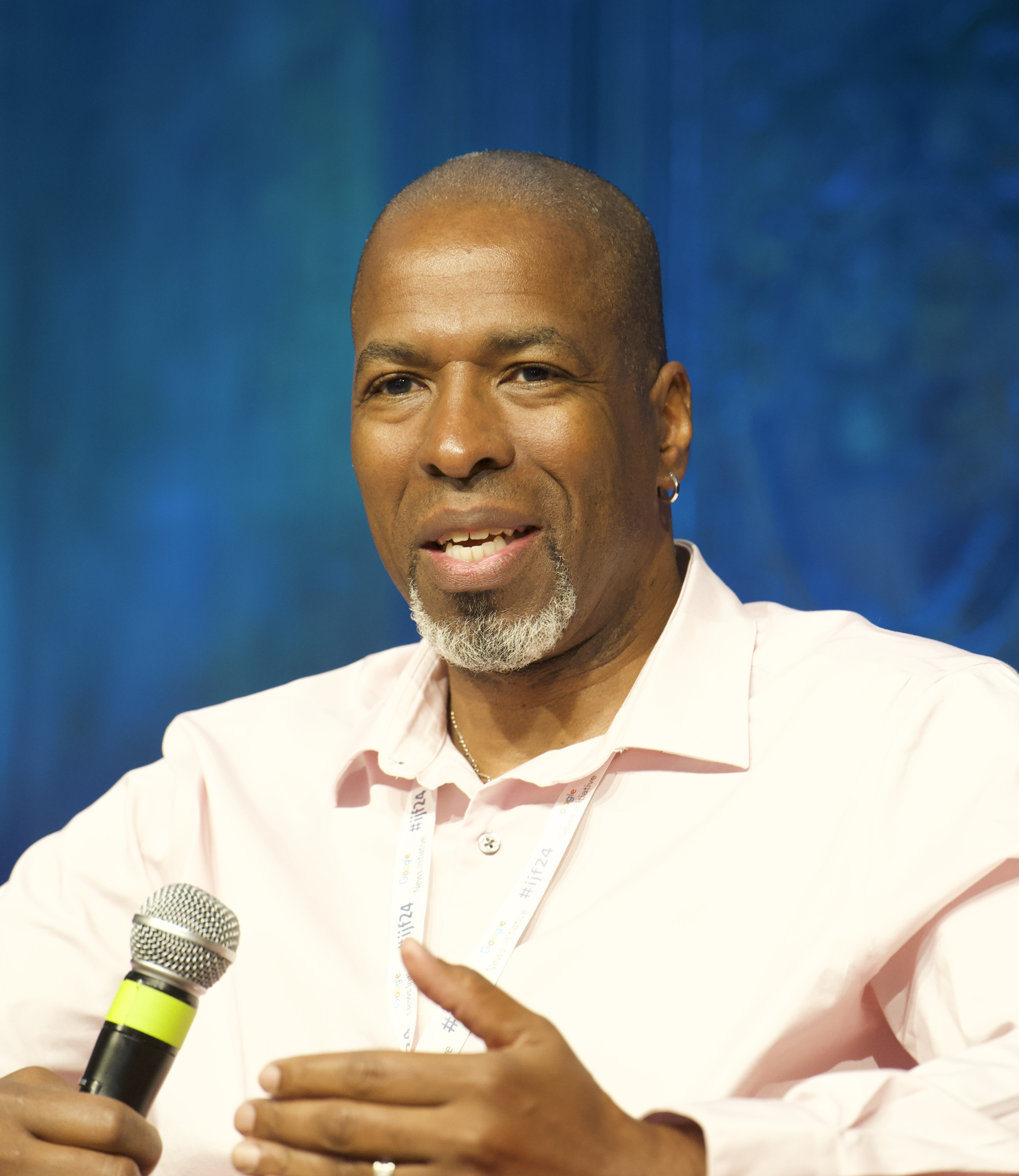
- Sterling at the International Journalism Festival in 2024
- Born: Cape Girardeau, Missouri, U.S.
- Education: Washington University School of Law, 1992; Millikin University, 1989
- Occupations: Fraud investigator (2004–2011); Lawyer (unknown–present); Former undercover CIA officer (May 14, 1993 – January 31, 2002)
- Known for: Whistleblower
- Spouse: Holly Sterling

Jeffrey Alexander Sterling is an American lawyer and former CIA employee who was arrested, charged, and convicted of violating the Espionage Act for revealing details about Operation Merlin (a covert operation to supply Iran with flawed nuclear warhead blueprints) to journalist James Risen. Sterling claimed he was prosecuted as punishment for filing a race discrimination lawsuit against the CIA. The case was based on what the judge called "very powerful circumstantial evidence." In May 2015, Sterling was sentenced to 3½ years in prison. In 2016 and 2017, he filed complaints and wrote letters regarding mistreatment, lack of medical treatment for life-threatening conditions, and false allegations against him by corrections officers leading to further punitive measures. He was released from prison in January 2018.

== Early life and education ==
Sterling was born in Cape Girardeau, Missouri. Sterling earned a political science degree at Millikin University in Decatur, Illinois, in 1989. In 1992, he graduated from the Washington University School of Law in St. Louis, Missouri as a Juris Doctor.

== CIA employment ==
Sterling joined the CIA on May 14, 1993. In 1995, he was promoted to operations officer in the Iran group of the CIA's Near East and South Asia division. He held a top secret security clearance and had access to sensitive compartmented information, including classified cables, CIA spies, and operations.

After training in Persian in 1997, he was sent first to Bonn, Germany, and two years later to New York City to recruit Iranian nationals as agents for the CIA as part of a secret intelligence operation involving Iran's weapons capabilities. From early 1998 to May 2000, Sterling assumed responsibility as case officer for a Russian emigre with an engineering background in nuclear physics and production, whom the CIA employed as a carrier to pass flawed design plans to the Iranians.

In April 2000, Sterling filed a complaint with the CIA's Equal Employment Office about management's alleged racial discrimination practices. The CIA subsequently revoked Sterling's authorization to receive or possess classified documents concerning the secret operation and placed him on administrative leave in March 2001.

After the failure of two settlement attempts, his contract with the CIA was terminated on January 31, 2002.

== Equal Employment lawsuit ==
Sterling's lawsuit accusing CIA officials of racial discrimination was forced to be dismissed by invoking the state secrets privilege. The 4th U.S. Circuit Court of Appeals upheld the dismissal, ruling in 2005 that "there is no way for Sterling to prove employment discrimination without exposing at least some classified details of the covert employment that gives context to his claim."

== Conviction under the Espionage Act ==
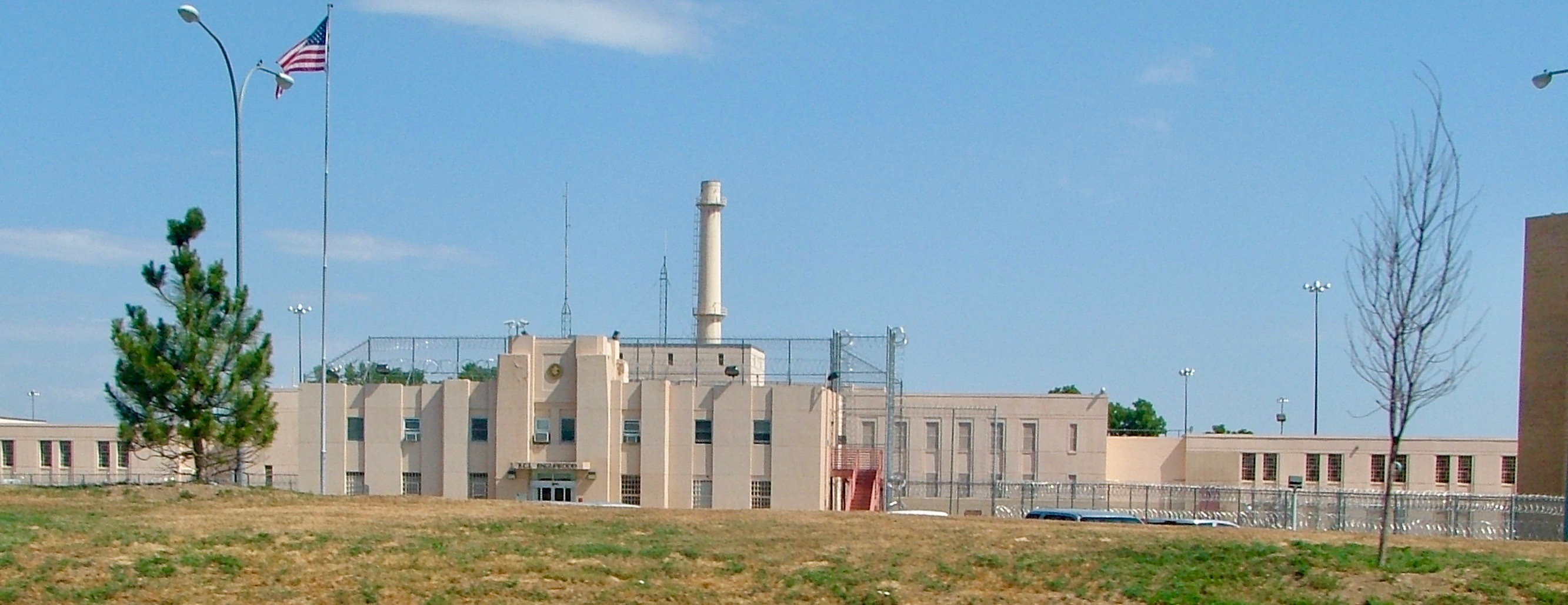
FCI Englewood, where Sterling was located

Between 2002 and 2004, the U.S. federal government intercepted several interstate emails to and from Sterling, which were "(...) routed through a server located in the Eastern District of Virginia (...)". The authorities also traced telephone calls between Sterling and journalist James Risen. In the intercepted communications, Sterling is alleged to have revealed national defense information to an unauthorized person. In March 2003, Sterling also raised concerns with the Senate Intelligence Committee about a "poorly executed and dangerous Operation Merlin."

On December 22, 2010, U.S. attorney Neil H. MacBride filed an indictment against Sterling on the unlawful retention and unauthorized disclosure of national defense information, mail fraud, unauthorized conveyance of government property, and obstruction of justice. Sterling was arrested on January 6, 2011. Sterling became the fifth individual in the history of the United States who has been charged, under the Espionage Act, with mishandling national defense information.

In a hearing at the U.S. District Court on January 14, 2011, Sterling's defense attorney, Edward MacMahon, entered a not guilty plea. MacMahon reported to the court that he was still waiting for clearance to discuss the case in detail with his client. Rather than relying exclusively on records of electronic communications to legally establish that Sterling exchanged information with Risen, the prosecution has subpoenaed Risen to testify and reveal his journalistic sources, an effort which Risen and his attorneys contested.

Sterling maintained that his communications with Risen did not involve secret information, and the prosecution was designed to punish him for filing a race discrimination suit against the CIA. He was convicted of espionage charges on January 26, 2015. Sentencing was originally scheduled for April 24, but after learning of the sentence of no more than two years’ probation plus a fine given one day earlier to David Petraeus for the misdemeanor of unauthorized removal and retention of classified material, Sterling's lawyers submitted a plea that Sterling "not receive a different form of justice" than Petraeus, asking for a similarly lenient sentence instead of the 19 to 24 years imprisonment sought by the federal prosecutors. On May 11, 2015, U.S. District Judge Leonie Brinkema sentenced Sterling to 3½ years in prison. Judge Brinkema said there was "no more critical secret" than revealing the identity of a man working with the CIA, and that Sterling deserved a harsher penalty than other recent leakers because he had not pleaded guilty or admitted wrongdoing. The judge said she was moved by his accomplishments but needed to send a message to others: "If you do knowingly reveal these secrets, there's going to be a price to be paid." On June 22, 2017, a three-judge panel of the 4th Circuit U.S. Court of Appeals upheld the sentence.

Sterling was incarcerated at FCI Englewood. In 2016, Sterling's wife said that she was afraid that Sterling could die of health issues behind bars. In September 2016, Sterling detailed the FBI's continued indifference in his seeking treatment for a severe heart condition, in letters which were published by Common Dreams. In April 2017 Sterling was placed into solitary confinement after he allegedly threatened an officer. He was allegedly "denied medication for his heart condition and endured a cardiac-related episode" while in solitary confinement.

== Personal life ==
Sterling is married to Holly Sterling, a social worker. They met via Match.com. On their second date, they agreed to get married barefoot on the beach. They were married in Jamaica.

== Awards ==
Sterling earned a national 2010 Anti-Fraud Award from the Blue Cross Blue Shield Association for helping break up a Medicare fraud ring, leading to estimated recoveries and savings of US$32 million.

Sterling was awarded the 2019 Sam Adams Award.

== See also ==
- Nuclear program of Iran
- Thomas Andrews Drake (NSA whistleblower charged under the Espionage Act, 2010)
- Stephen Jin-Woo Kim (State Department contractor convicted under Espionage Act, 2010)
