= Eli Rosenbaum =

American financier and lawyer (born 1955)

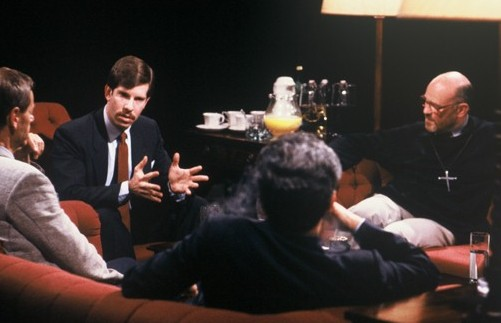
- Rosenbaum (left) on television discussion program After Dark in 1987 (more here)
- Born: May 8, 1955 (age 71); New York, United States
- Education: University of Pennsylvania (BS); Harvard Law School (JD)
- Occupations: Attorney and Financier
- Employer(s): United States Department of Justice, Criminal Division, Human Rights and Special Prosecutions Section
- Title: Director of Human Rights Enforcement Strategy and Policy

Eli M. Rosenbaum (born May 8, 1955) is an American financier, lawyer and the former Director of the United States Department of Justice, Office of Special Investigations (OSI), which was primarily responsible for identifying, denaturalizing, and deporting Nazi war criminals, from 1995 to 2010, when OSI was merged into the new Human Rights and Special Prosecutions Section. He became the Director of Human Rights Enforcement Strategy and Policy in that section and in 2022 he was appointed by U.S. Attorney General Merrick B. Garland to launch and lead the Department's War Crimes Accountability Team (WarCAT), to pursue justice in the wake of war crimes and human rights crimes committed following Russia's invasion of Ukraine earlier that year. He has been termed a "legendary Nazi hunter." Rosenbaum retired from federal service in January 2024.

== Early life ==
Eli Rosenbaum was born in Westbury, New York on May 8, 1955, to parents Irving and Hanni Rosenbaum. His father, who was Jewish and escaped the Nazi regime in 1938, was a World War II veteran of the North African and European Theaters. After the war, while still serving in the U.S. Army, he questioned former Nazis and collaborators (such as the filmmaker Leni Riefenstahl), some of whom were subsequently tried at Nuremberg and elsewhere. Later, Irving Rosenbaum was a Manhattan-based philanthropist and the chairman of the former S.E. Nichols Corp. Co-founded by Irving's father, Nichols Corp. was a pioneering owner and operator of discount department stores in the United States, competing with Kmart, Walmart, and other companies that later entered that retailing sector. The company, which opened its first store in 1960 (in Lancaster, Pennsylvania), two years before the first Wal-Mart, Kmart, Target, and Woolco stores opened, went public via an IPO in 1969, and by 1977 it was the 33rd largest discount retailer in the United States as measured by annual sales ($204 million).

Eli grew up in Westbury, New York, and attended W. Tresper Clarke High School. He graduated summa cum laude in 1976 from the Wharton School of the University of Pennsylvania, from which he also received his MBA degree. He became employed by the United States Justice Department through the Honors Program after his graduation from Harvard Law School in 1980.

== Nazi hunter ==
Rosenbaum was a trial attorney with OSI from 1980 to 1984. In 1984, he left the Department of Justice to work as a corporate litigator with the Manhattan law firm of Simpson Thacher & Bartlett and then as General Counsel of the World Jewish Congress. He later returned to OSI in 1988 where he was appointed Principal Deputy Director and then Director. In introducing the Human Rights Enforcement Act of 2009 on July 20, 2009, Senator Richard Durbin (D-IL) stated on the floor of the Senate: "Due to OSI’s outstanding work, the U.S. is the only country in the world to receive an ‘‘A’’ rating from the Simon Wiesenthal Center for bringing Nazi war criminals to justice. I especially want to commend Eli Rosenbaum, who has worked at OSI for more than two decades and has been OSI’s director since 1995. OSI’s success is due in large measure to Mr. Rosenbaum’s leadership and personal dedication to holding Nazi perpetrators accountable." On June 19, 1997, Senator Alfonse M. D'Amato (R-NY) praised Rosenbaum's work, and that of others, in connection with the then-ongoing Senate Banking Committee inquiry into looted Holocaust-era assets.

Rosenbaum has been described as a "Nazi hunter" by historians for his professional career work both in the government and with private organizations. (Note: According to several media sources, including the New York Times, the nickname “Nazi Hunter” is “a sobriquet [Rosenbaum] dislikes.” Rosenbaum has commented: “[I]t suggests that the work prosecutors and investigators do in this area . . . is a sport of some sort, that it is a game or a movie. In fact, it is very serious, professional, and often heartbreaking law enforcement work.”) British historian Guy Walters has termed Rosenbaum “the world’s most successful Nazi hunter,” adding that because of the extensive self-promotion activities of self-styled “private” Nazi-hunters, “It is telling that most readers will not have heard of [him] despite the fact that he and his organization have more than one hundred Nazi ‘scalps’ – which is considerably more than the combined total of Simon Wiesenthal and every other Nazi hunter.” In his book Useful Enemies: John Demjanjuk and America's Open-Door Policy for Nazi War Criminals, Richard Rashke wrote: "As new revelations about Nazi war criminals and their collaborators find their way into the media, Americans who do care will have Eli Rosenbaum and [former U.S. congresswoman] Elizabeth Holtzman to thank."

In an early television appearance in Britain, in 1987 Rosenbaum joined the After Dark discussion programme alongside Neal Ascherson, Gena Turgel, Philippe Daudy and Paul Oestreicher to debate Jacques Vergès, Klaus Barbie's defense attorney.

The U.S. Justice Department Nazi-hunter character in Jodi Picoult's 2013 novel The Storyteller (which reached #1 on The New York Times fiction bestseller list), about the pursuit of an alleged Nazi war criminal in New England, was based loosely on Rosenbaum. In a Washington Post interview, Picoult called him “a modern-day superhero.” Under his leadership, OSI was called "the most successful government Nazi-hunting organization on earth" and "the world's most aggressive and effective Nazi-hunting operation." The Simon Wiesenthal Center characterized OSI as the world's only "highly successful proactive prosecution program" in Nazi cases and USA Today reported that OSI possessed "a tremendous success record . . . [having] uncovered and won more cases than any other Nazi-hunting operation in the world."

In 1997, Rosenbaum was selected by the faculty of the University of Pennsylvania Law School to receive the school's Honorary Fellowship Award which commended him for "making significant contributions to the ends of justice at the cost of great personal risk and sacrifice." He has also received the Anti-Defamation League's "Heroes in Blue" award and the Assistant Attorney General's Award for Human Rights Enforcement and the Criminal Division's Award for Special Initiative. In 2023, he received the Attorney General's Award for Exceptional Service, which is the Justice Department's highest award for employee performance.

Cases investigated and prosecuted under Rosenbaum's direction have resulted in deportations to Europe of Nazi perpetrators such as John Demjanjuk, subsequently convicted there of participation in tens of thousands of Holocaust murders. On January 11, 2008, he was profiled as the weekly "Making a Difference" feature on NBC Nightly News with Brian Williams.

== Kurt Waldheim controversy ==
Rosenbaum directed the World Jewish Congress investigation that resulted in the worldwide 1986 exposure of the Nazi past of former United Nations Secretary General Kurt Waldheim, arguably the most "sensational" uncovering of a Nazi in postwar history. Rosenbaum was the primary author of Betrayal: The Untold Story of the Kurt Waldheim Investigation and Cover-Up, a book which was selected for "Notable Books of 1993" by The New York Times and "Best Books and Audiotapes of 1993" by The San Francisco Chronicle and which demonstrates that Waldheim was involved in the commission of Nazi war crimes while serving in the German military as an officer under the Nazi regime and postulates a Soviet-Yugoslav conspiracy to help whitewash his history. After the war, Waldheim became Austria's foreign minister and its United Nations ambassador.

At the time of his exposure at the hands of Rosenbaum, Waldheim had served most prominently as Secretary General of the United Nations and was a candidate for the presidency of Austria (an election that he won in 1987 despite the exposure of his Nazi past). He was never officially considered to be a suspect by the Austrian Government in any war crimes, but he was banned from entering the United States as a result of a U.S. Government investigation in 1986–87 that concluded that he was complicit in the perpetration of Nazi crimes during World War II. Writing in The New York Times, James R. Oestreich claimed that the "final blow" to Austria's self-portrayal as a victim of the German Nazi regime, rather than its willing partner, "may have been the election of Kurt Waldheim as president of Austria in 1986, after it had become widely known that he had lied about his complicity in Nazi war crimes."

== Elie Wiesel award ==
The Justice Department's Office of Special Investigations was a 2021 recipient of the Elie Wiesel Award, the highest award of the United States Holocaust Memorial Museum. The award was established in 2011 and recognizes "internationally prominent individuals whose actions embody the Museum’s vision of a world where people confront hate, prevent genocide, and promote human dignity." The award was accepted on behalf of the office "by former OSI Director Eli Rosenbaum, under whose leadership the majority of the unit’s prosecution successes were achieved."

== War crimes in the Russian invasion of Ukraine ==
During a surprise visit to Ukraine on June 21, 2022, United States Attorney General Merrick Garland issued an announcement that Rosenbaum had been tapped to lead a team, given the name War Crimes Accountability Team (WarCAT), to investigate war crimes in that nation. Rosenbaum was tasked with coordinating efforts throughout the federal government to hold accountable those responsible for committing war crimes in Ukraine. It was announced that he would be assisted by prosecutors from the Justice Department's Human Rights and Special Prosecutions Section. The team will also support the Justice Department's ongoing investigation of potential war crimes over which the United States has jurisdiction, including the wounding and killing of American journalists covering the Russian invasion.

Regarding the congressional bill introduced after Russia's invasion of Ukraine, which would allow the United States to prosecute war criminals even if neither the war criminals nor their victims are Americans, Rosembaum said: "The word that guides us is: we will be relentless. So the message to perpetrators or would-be perpetrators is: if you act on criminal orders or issue criminal orders, you may well have to spend the rest of your life looking over your shoulder. Don’t think about being a tourist after the war in most of Europe, because if we know about you, if Ukrainians know about you, if the ICC knows about you, you may just get arrested and extradited. So it’s a different world."

On September 4, 2023, Ukrainian President Volodymyr Zelenskyy conferred on Rosenbaum Ukraine's Order of Merit, awarding the title Chevalier (Knight) of the Order of Merit, for support that he rendered to Ukraine's pursuit of justice in the wake of Russian Federation aggression, war crimes, and crimes against humanity committed during and after its 2022 invasion.

On December 6, 2023, the Department of Justice announced that, as a result of a WarCAT-led investigative effort in which the FBI and the Department of Homeland Security's Homeland Security Investigations (HSI) participated, the department had indicted four Russia-affiliated military personnel with committing war crimes, including torture, inhuman treatment, and unlawful confinement of a U.S. national in Ukraine following Russia's full-scale invasion of Ukraine in February 2022. This action made the United States the first national jurisdiction other than Ukraine to have brought criminal charges against alleged Russian war criminals.

== War crimes in the Israel-Hamas War ==
In 2024, Rosenbaum denied and condemned the international allegations of genocide in the 2023 Israeli attack on Gaza, instead accusing Hamas of being genocidal.
