= Mail screening =

Mail screening is the physical screening of post/mail prior to reaching its final destination. This may be from a postroom/mailroom or from an external premise through a professional mail screening provider.

Typically this is a security function of an organisation and differing levels of security are required for mail screening depending on the risks associated with/to the organisation.

A specification for mail screening and security (PAS 97) provides relevant information on what is important for an organisation. This is available from BSI Group.

Professional security consultants will have an in-depth knowledge of these processes.
