= Federal Correctional Institution, Thomson =

Maximum security federal prison in Illinois

- Interactive map of Federal Correctional Institution, Thomson
- Location: Thomson, Illinois; 41°58′20″N 90°6′30″W
- Status: Operational
- Security class: Low-security (with minimum-security prison camp)
- Population: 1,555 [1,424 at the FCI, 131 in prison camp] (December 2023)
- Opened: 2001
- Managed by: Federal Bureau of Prisons

The Federal Correctional Institution, Thomson (FCI Thomson), (Note: Formerly called the Administrative United States Penitentiary, Thomson (AUSP Thomson) from 2012 to 2020 and was subsequently renamed the United States Penitentiary, Thomson (USP Thomson) from 2020 to 2023. In 2023, the facility was reclassified as a low-security institution and was renamed the Federal Correctional Institution, Thomson (FCI Thomson).) formerly Thomson Correctional Center, is a low-security federal prison located in Thomson, Illinois. It has an area of about 146 acres (59 ha) and comprises 15 buildings. The facility is enclosed by a 15-foot (4.6 m), 7000 volt electric fence surrounded by an additional 12-foot (3.7 m) exterior fence covered with razor wire. Thomson has eight cellhouses with a rated capacity of 2,100 beds—1,900 high-security SMU beds and 200 minimum-security beds at the onsite camp—and according to BOP officials, the potential to use some of its high-security rated capacity to house up to 400 ADX inmates. From its completion in 2001 to 2006, it remained empty. By 2009, only the minimum-security section housed prisoners.

In October 2012, the Federal Bureau of Prisons (BOP) purchased Thomson Correctional Center from the State of Illinois for $165 million. Plans to transfer inmates from Guantanamo Bay to the facility had already been blocked by Congress.

In August 2014, Donald Hudson was named the first warden of the prison. The prison was fully activated in January 2019 and as of March 2020, the prison had an inmate population of 1,067. In June 2019, the prison crossed the 400 employee mark with an authorization to hire 200 more over the next few years as inmate population continues to ramp up. As of December 2023, FCI Thomson holds 1,424 inmates at the low-security FCI and 131 at the minimum security camp.

== History ==
The building of the prison was controversial; early plans suggested using the site of the former Savanna Army Depot, several miles north of Thomson. One of the main reasons the prison was controversial was concern that the prison would have a negative impact on the environment, especially being so close to the Mississippi River.

Thomson Correctional Center was built between May 1999 and November 2001. Its completion cost $140 million, but the state omitted opening costs from the 2002 budget, and Governor George H. Ryan called for a delay to the opening to save $50 million per year in operating costs. By 2009, the total cost to the state of Illinois had exceeded $170 million. The minimum security unit has an annual budget of $7 million. State budget constraints as well as labor union opposition to closing other state prisons prevented the maximum-security prison from opening.

In 2008, Illinois Governor Rod Blagojevich proposed to close the state prison in Pontiac and to open the Thomson maximum-security unit instead. However, Blagojevich was subsequently arrested on December 9, 2008, and was removed from office. His replacement, Governor Pat Quinn, cancelled plans to close the Pontiac prison in March 2009, leaving Thomson unused.

=== Transfer of Guantanamo Bay detainees ===
On December 15, 2009, U.S. President Barack Obama, via a Presidential memorandum, formally ordered the departments of Justice and Defense to arrange federal ownership of the prison, and prepare for transfer there of both federal prisoners and Guantanamo detainees. According to previous press reports, the acquisition plan contemplated housing up to 100 inmates from the camp, in addition to other federal prisoners. The Federal Bureau of Prisons would erect a more secure perimeter fence, so its perimeter security exceeded supermax standards. The portion of the Thomson prison that would be used to house Guantanamo detainees would be operated by the Department of Defense, while the rest of the prison would be operated by the Federal Bureau of Prisons.

CNN stated that before the decision was announced, many in the town had welcomed the idea of Guantanamo prisoners being housed in their town, in hopes it would revitalize the local economy and bring jobs. However, funding for detainee transfers was blocked.

=== Federal Bureau of Prisons purchase ===
Illinois Senator Dick Durbin’s office announced on October 2, 2012, that the Obama administration and Federal Bureau of Prisons would buy the Thomson Correctional Center from the state of Illinois for $165 million. An administration official said the deal was to address overcrowding issues, and Thomson would not be used to house any Guantanamo detainees, which the official noted was prohibited by law. "The entire facility will house only [Bureau of Prisons] inmates (up to 2,800) and be operated solely by BOP. Specifically, it will be used for administrative maximum security inmates and others who have proven difficult to manage in high-security institutions," said the official, who asked not to be named. This statement was echoed in a letter from United States Attorney General Eric Holder. "I have committed that no Guantanamo detainees will be transferred to Thomson. As you know, any such transfer would violate express legal statutory prohibitions," Holder said in a letter to Representative Frank Wolf, who fought the proposal.

Democratic Senator Dick Durbin of Illinois said the move would create 1,000 jobs in the area of Thomson. Federal officials have said that building a new prison instead of buying Thomson would take years and cost about $400 million. State officials estimated that annual operation of the facility would generate more than $122 million in operating expenditures, including salaries and $61 million in local business sales. The prison was fully activated in January 2019.

=== Conversion to a low-security institution ===
Following the closure of the Special Management Unit (SMU) at the United States Penitentiary, Lewisburg, the BOP moved the SMU to Thomson. However, following a series of inmate murders in the SMU program and issues related correction staffing, the BOP made the decision to permanently convert USP Thomson into a low-security facility. In March 2023, all high-security inmates were moved to different penitentiaries and by August 2023, the facility began to fill its beds with low-security inmates.

== Notable inmates ==
- Kodak Black - serving 46-month sentence for filing paperwork illegally on a handgun. Transferred to Thomson from USP Big Sandy in October 2020; scheduled for release in November 2022; sentence commuted by President Donald Trump on January 20, 2021
- Christopher Jeburk - bank robber and former FBI Ten Most Wanted fugitive serving a life sentence; kidnapped a bank teller and her family, then escaped from prison twice before he could be sentenced for his crimes; transferred from Leavenworth to Atlanta after an officer caught him trying to escape a third time
- John Tomkins - convicted in 2012 of mailing a dozen threatening letters and two pipe bombs to investment firms between 2005 and 2007 as part of a terror campaign aimed at driving up the value of stock he owned; serving a 37-year sentence; scheduled for release in 2038
- Daron Wint - sentenced to life imprisonment in 2018 for the robbery and murder of a family in Washington D.C.; Wint demanded a ransom before restraining and killing the family and their housekeeper.
